

535001–535100 

|-bgcolor=#E9E9E9
| 535001 ||  || — || January 30, 2011 || Haleakala || Pan-STARRS ||  || align=right data-sort-value="0.92" | 920 m || 
|-id=002 bgcolor=#E9E9E9
| 535002 ||  || — || November 22, 2006 || Mount Lemmon || Mount Lemmon Survey ||  || align=right data-sort-value="0.76" | 760 m || 
|-id=003 bgcolor=#fefefe
| 535003 ||  || — || September 3, 2010 || Mount Lemmon || Mount Lemmon Survey ||  || align=right data-sort-value="0.72" | 720 m || 
|-id=004 bgcolor=#d6d6d6
| 535004 ||  || — || November 27, 2009 || Kitt Peak || Spacewatch ||  || align=right | 3.8 km || 
|-id=005 bgcolor=#E9E9E9
| 535005 ||  || — || February 7, 2011 || La Sagra || OAM Obs. ||  || align=right | 1.2 km || 
|-id=006 bgcolor=#E9E9E9
| 535006 ||  || — || October 30, 2014 || Mount Lemmon || Mount Lemmon Survey || EUN || align=right | 1.2 km || 
|-id=007 bgcolor=#E9E9E9
| 535007 ||  || — || September 29, 2009 || Mount Lemmon || Mount Lemmon Survey ||  || align=right | 1.8 km || 
|-id=008 bgcolor=#E9E9E9
| 535008 ||  || — || September 23, 2009 || Mount Lemmon || Mount Lemmon Survey ||  || align=right | 1.6 km || 
|-id=009 bgcolor=#d6d6d6
| 535009 ||  || — || November 28, 2014 || Haleakala || Pan-STARRS || BRA || align=right | 1.4 km || 
|-id=010 bgcolor=#E9E9E9
| 535010 ||  || — || December 7, 2005 || Kitt Peak || Spacewatch ||  || align=right | 1.3 km || 
|-id=011 bgcolor=#E9E9E9
| 535011 ||  || — || October 15, 2013 || Mount Lemmon || Mount Lemmon Survey ||  || align=right | 2.4 km || 
|-id=012 bgcolor=#E9E9E9
| 535012 ||  || — || June 14, 2013 || Mount Lemmon || Mount Lemmon Survey ||  || align=right | 3.1 km || 
|-id=013 bgcolor=#fefefe
| 535013 ||  || — || November 7, 2007 || Mount Lemmon || Mount Lemmon Survey ||  || align=right | 1.0 km || 
|-id=014 bgcolor=#fefefe
| 535014 ||  || — || February 3, 2000 || Socorro || LINEAR ||  || align=right data-sort-value="0.75" | 750 m || 
|-id=015 bgcolor=#E9E9E9
| 535015 ||  || — || January 8, 2010 || WISE || WISE ||  || align=right | 3.0 km || 
|-id=016 bgcolor=#E9E9E9
| 535016 ||  || — || August 31, 2014 || Haleakala || Pan-STARRS ||  || align=right data-sort-value="0.79" | 790 m || 
|-id=017 bgcolor=#C2E0FF
| 535017 ||  || — || February 9, 2013 || Haleakala || Pan-STARRS || centaur || align=right | 140 km || 
|-id=018 bgcolor=#C2E0FF
| 535018 ||  || — || May 31, 2010 || Haleakala || Pan-STARRS || cubewano (cold) || align=right | 280 km || 
|-id=019 bgcolor=#C2E0FF
| 535019 ||  || — || February 9, 2013 || Haleakala || Pan-STARRS || res3:4critical || align=right | 152 km || 
|-id=020 bgcolor=#C2E0FF
| 535020 ||  || — || September 6, 2010 || Haleakala || Pan-STARRS || other TNO || align=right | 297 km || 
|-id=021 bgcolor=#C2E0FF
| 535021 ||  || — || January 9, 2014 || Haleakala || Pan-STARRS || cubewano? || align=right | 267 km || 
|-id=022 bgcolor=#C2E0FF
| 535022 ||  || — || January 30, 2011 || Haleakala || Pan-STARRS || cubewano (hot)critical || align=right | 255 km || 
|-id=023 bgcolor=#C2E0FF
| 535023 ||  || — || May 31, 2010 || Haleakala || Pan-STARRS || cubewano (cold) || align=right | 243 km || 
|-id=024 bgcolor=#C2E0FF
| 535024 ||  || — || November 2, 2010 || Haleakala || Pan-STARRS || plutino || align=right | 152 km || 
|-id=025 bgcolor=#C2E0FF
| 535025 ||  || — || November 25, 2011 || Haleakala || Pan-STARRS || twotino || align=right | 159 km || 
|-id=026 bgcolor=#C2E0FF
| 535026 ||  || — || September 2, 2010 || Haleakala || Pan-STARRS || other TNO || align=right | 203 km || 
|-id=027 bgcolor=#C2E0FF
| 535027 ||  || — || January 30, 2011 || Haleakala || Pan-STARRS || cubewano? || align=right | 294 km || 
|-id=028 bgcolor=#C2E0FF
| 535028 ||  || — || May 31, 2010 || Haleakala || Pan-STARRS || cubewano (cold) || align=right | 293 km || 
|-id=029 bgcolor=#C2E0FF
| 535029 ||  || — || September 6, 2010 || Haleakala || Pan-STARRS || plutino || align=right | 203 km || 
|-id=030 bgcolor=#C2E0FF
| 535030 ||  || — || June 1, 2010 || Haleakala || Pan-STARRS || SDO || align=right | 202 km || 
|-id=031 bgcolor=#C2E0FF
| 535031 ||  || — || February 10, 2011 || Haleakala || Pan-STARRS || SDO || align=right | 220 km || 
|-id=032 bgcolor=#C2E0FF
| 535032 ||  || — || March 14, 2012 || Haleakala || Pan-STARRS || plutino || align=right | 147 km || 
|-id=033 bgcolor=#C2FFFF
| 535033 ||  || — || April 12, 2010 || WISE || WISE || L5 || align=right | 11 km || 
|-id=034 bgcolor=#E9E9E9
| 535034 ||  || — || December 4, 2005 || Kitt Peak || Spacewatch ||  || align=right | 2.7 km || 
|-id=035 bgcolor=#E9E9E9
| 535035 ||  || — || December 5, 2005 || Kitt Peak || Spacewatch ||  || align=right | 1.7 km || 
|-id=036 bgcolor=#fefefe
| 535036 ||  || — || October 1, 2010 || Kitt Peak || Spacewatch ||  || align=right data-sort-value="0.75" | 750 m || 
|-id=037 bgcolor=#fefefe
| 535037 ||  || — || November 2, 2007 || Mount Lemmon || Mount Lemmon Survey ||  || align=right data-sort-value="0.75" | 750 m || 
|-id=038 bgcolor=#fefefe
| 535038 ||  || — || November 21, 2014 || Haleakala || Pan-STARRS ||  || align=right data-sort-value="0.64" | 640 m || 
|-id=039 bgcolor=#E9E9E9
| 535039 ||  || — || June 20, 2013 || Mount Lemmon || Mount Lemmon Survey ||  || align=right | 1.9 km || 
|-id=040 bgcolor=#fefefe
| 535040 ||  || — || January 19, 2012 || Kitt Peak || Spacewatch ||  || align=right data-sort-value="0.60" | 600 m || 
|-id=041 bgcolor=#E9E9E9
| 535041 ||  || — || August 13, 2012 || Haleakala || Pan-STARRS ||  || align=right | 2.3 km || 
|-id=042 bgcolor=#E9E9E9
| 535042 ||  || — || December 5, 2010 || Mount Lemmon || Mount Lemmon Survey ||  || align=right | 2.0 km || 
|-id=043 bgcolor=#E9E9E9
| 535043 ||  || — || September 24, 2009 || Mount Lemmon || Mount Lemmon Survey ||  || align=right | 1.5 km || 
|-id=044 bgcolor=#E9E9E9
| 535044 ||  || — || June 7, 2013 || Mount Lemmon || Mount Lemmon Survey ||  || align=right | 1.6 km || 
|-id=045 bgcolor=#E9E9E9
| 535045 ||  || — || July 9, 2013 || Haleakala || Pan-STARRS ||  || align=right | 2.1 km || 
|-id=046 bgcolor=#d6d6d6
| 535046 ||  || — || May 20, 2005 || Mount Lemmon || Mount Lemmon Survey ||  || align=right | 3.0 km || 
|-id=047 bgcolor=#E9E9E9
| 535047 ||  || — || October 29, 2005 || Mount Lemmon || Mount Lemmon Survey ||  || align=right | 1.4 km || 
|-id=048 bgcolor=#E9E9E9
| 535048 ||  || — || April 20, 2012 || Mount Lemmon || Mount Lemmon Survey ||  || align=right | 2.0 km || 
|-id=049 bgcolor=#E9E9E9
| 535049 ||  || — || October 25, 2005 || Mount Lemmon || Mount Lemmon Survey ||  || align=right | 2.2 km || 
|-id=050 bgcolor=#E9E9E9
| 535050 ||  || — || April 15, 2012 || Haleakala || Pan-STARRS ||  || align=right data-sort-value="0.84" | 840 m || 
|-id=051 bgcolor=#E9E9E9
| 535051 ||  || — || February 28, 2008 || Mount Lemmon || Mount Lemmon Survey ||  || align=right data-sort-value="0.84" | 840 m || 
|-id=052 bgcolor=#E9E9E9
| 535052 ||  || — || November 10, 2010 || Mount Lemmon || Mount Lemmon Survey ||  || align=right data-sort-value="0.78" | 780 m || 
|-id=053 bgcolor=#E9E9E9
| 535053 ||  || — || November 22, 2014 || Haleakala || Pan-STARRS ||  || align=right | 1.5 km || 
|-id=054 bgcolor=#E9E9E9
| 535054 ||  || — || October 28, 2010 || Mount Lemmon || Mount Lemmon Survey ||  || align=right data-sort-value="0.97" | 970 m || 
|-id=055 bgcolor=#fefefe
| 535055 ||  || — || January 1, 2008 || Kitt Peak || Spacewatch ||  || align=right data-sort-value="0.76" | 760 m || 
|-id=056 bgcolor=#E9E9E9
| 535056 ||  || — || December 14, 2010 || Mount Lemmon || Mount Lemmon Survey ||  || align=right | 1.3 km || 
|-id=057 bgcolor=#fefefe
| 535057 ||  || — || October 2, 2006 || Mount Lemmon || Mount Lemmon Survey ||  || align=right data-sort-value="0.83" | 830 m || 
|-id=058 bgcolor=#E9E9E9
| 535058 ||  || — || January 27, 2011 || Mount Lemmon || Mount Lemmon Survey ||  || align=right data-sort-value="0.96" | 960 m || 
|-id=059 bgcolor=#E9E9E9
| 535059 ||  || — || March 19, 2007 || Mount Lemmon || Mount Lemmon Survey ||  || align=right | 2.6 km || 
|-id=060 bgcolor=#d6d6d6
| 535060 ||  || — || November 26, 2013 || Mount Lemmon || Mount Lemmon Survey ||  || align=right | 2.9 km || 
|-id=061 bgcolor=#d6d6d6
| 535061 ||  || — || December 21, 2008 || Mount Lemmon || Mount Lemmon Survey ||  || align=right | 2.7 km || 
|-id=062 bgcolor=#E9E9E9
| 535062 ||  || — || May 14, 2008 || Mount Lemmon || Mount Lemmon Survey ||  || align=right | 2.0 km || 
|-id=063 bgcolor=#fefefe
| 535063 ||  || — || November 17, 2014 || Haleakala || Pan-STARRS ||  || align=right data-sort-value="0.68" | 680 m || 
|-id=064 bgcolor=#fefefe
| 535064 ||  || — || February 25, 2012 || Kitt Peak || Spacewatch ||  || align=right data-sort-value="0.74" | 740 m || 
|-id=065 bgcolor=#E9E9E9
| 535065 ||  || — || August 4, 2013 || Haleakala || Pan-STARRS ||  || align=right | 1.5 km || 
|-id=066 bgcolor=#fefefe
| 535066 ||  || — || April 30, 2008 || Mount Lemmon || Mount Lemmon Survey ||  || align=right data-sort-value="0.80" | 800 m || 
|-id=067 bgcolor=#E9E9E9
| 535067 ||  || — || January 3, 2011 || Mount Lemmon || Mount Lemmon Survey ||  || align=right data-sort-value="0.89" | 890 m || 
|-id=068 bgcolor=#fefefe
| 535068 ||  || — || December 10, 2010 || Mount Lemmon || Mount Lemmon Survey ||  || align=right data-sort-value="0.81" | 810 m || 
|-id=069 bgcolor=#d6d6d6
| 535069 ||  || — || June 11, 2010 || WISE || WISE ||  || align=right | 2.8 km || 
|-id=070 bgcolor=#d6d6d6
| 535070 ||  || — || November 20, 2003 || Socorro || LINEAR ||  || align=right | 2.9 km || 
|-id=071 bgcolor=#E9E9E9
| 535071 ||  || — || October 18, 2009 || Catalina || CSS ||  || align=right | 2.3 km || 
|-id=072 bgcolor=#E9E9E9
| 535072 ||  || — || January 30, 2011 || Mount Lemmon || Mount Lemmon Survey ||  || align=right | 1.3 km || 
|-id=073 bgcolor=#E9E9E9
| 535073 ||  || — || September 20, 2009 || Mount Lemmon || Mount Lemmon Survey ||  || align=right | 1.7 km || 
|-id=074 bgcolor=#E9E9E9
| 535074 ||  || — || January 16, 2011 || Mount Lemmon || Mount Lemmon Survey ||  || align=right data-sort-value="0.71" | 710 m || 
|-id=075 bgcolor=#E9E9E9
| 535075 ||  || — || August 30, 2005 || Kitt Peak || Spacewatch ||  || align=right | 1.3 km || 
|-id=076 bgcolor=#fefefe
| 535076 ||  || — || January 30, 2012 || Kitt Peak || Spacewatch ||  || align=right data-sort-value="0.64" | 640 m || 
|-id=077 bgcolor=#E9E9E9
| 535077 ||  || — || July 13, 2013 || Haleakala || Pan-STARRS ||  || align=right data-sort-value="0.88" | 880 m || 
|-id=078 bgcolor=#E9E9E9
| 535078 ||  || — || October 9, 2005 || Kitt Peak || Spacewatch ||  || align=right data-sort-value="0.76" | 760 m || 
|-id=079 bgcolor=#E9E9E9
| 535079 ||  || — || January 9, 2011 || Kitt Peak || Spacewatch ||  || align=right | 2.1 km || 
|-id=080 bgcolor=#E9E9E9
| 535080 ||  || — || January 10, 2011 || Mount Lemmon || Mount Lemmon Survey ||  || align=right | 1.2 km || 
|-id=081 bgcolor=#fefefe
| 535081 ||  || — || September 4, 2010 || Mount Lemmon || Mount Lemmon Survey ||  || align=right data-sort-value="0.56" | 560 m || 
|-id=082 bgcolor=#E9E9E9
| 535082 ||  || — || September 20, 2009 || Kitt Peak || Spacewatch ||  || align=right data-sort-value="0.99" | 990 m || 
|-id=083 bgcolor=#d6d6d6
| 535083 ||  || — || October 7, 2013 || Mount Lemmon || Mount Lemmon Survey ||  || align=right | 2.1 km || 
|-id=084 bgcolor=#E9E9E9
| 535084 ||  || — || April 30, 2003 || Kitt Peak || Spacewatch ||  || align=right | 2.2 km || 
|-id=085 bgcolor=#E9E9E9
| 535085 ||  || — || February 27, 2012 || Haleakala || Pan-STARRS ||  || align=right data-sort-value="0.79" | 790 m || 
|-id=086 bgcolor=#E9E9E9
| 535086 ||  || — || December 27, 2006 || Mount Lemmon || Mount Lemmon Survey ||  || align=right data-sort-value="0.87" | 870 m || 
|-id=087 bgcolor=#E9E9E9
| 535087 ||  || — || November 17, 2014 || Haleakala || Pan-STARRS ||  || align=right | 2.2 km || 
|-id=088 bgcolor=#E9E9E9
| 535088 ||  || — || June 7, 2013 || Haleakala || Pan-STARRS ||  || align=right | 1.0 km || 
|-id=089 bgcolor=#E9E9E9
| 535089 ||  || — || November 20, 2014 || Haleakala || Pan-STARRS ||  || align=right data-sort-value="0.80" | 800 m || 
|-id=090 bgcolor=#E9E9E9
| 535090 ||  || — || July 14, 2013 || Haleakala || Pan-STARRS ||  || align=right | 1.2 km || 
|-id=091 bgcolor=#E9E9E9
| 535091 ||  || — || November 20, 2014 || Haleakala || Pan-STARRS ||  || align=right data-sort-value="0.90" | 900 m || 
|-id=092 bgcolor=#E9E9E9
| 535092 ||  || — || February 17, 2007 || Mount Lemmon || Mount Lemmon Survey ||  || align=right | 1.1 km || 
|-id=093 bgcolor=#E9E9E9
| 535093 ||  || — || May 28, 2008 || Kitt Peak || Spacewatch ||  || align=right | 1.4 km || 
|-id=094 bgcolor=#E9E9E9
| 535094 ||  || — || August 31, 2005 || Kitt Peak || Spacewatch ||  || align=right | 1.2 km || 
|-id=095 bgcolor=#E9E9E9
| 535095 ||  || — || September 14, 2005 || Kitt Peak || Spacewatch ||  || align=right data-sort-value="0.91" | 910 m || 
|-id=096 bgcolor=#E9E9E9
| 535096 ||  || — || November 21, 2014 || Haleakala || Pan-STARRS ||  || align=right | 1.2 km || 
|-id=097 bgcolor=#d6d6d6
| 535097 ||  || — || September 14, 2013 || Haleakala || Pan-STARRS ||  || align=right | 2.7 km || 
|-id=098 bgcolor=#d6d6d6
| 535098 ||  || — || November 21, 2014 || Haleakala || Pan-STARRS ||  || align=right | 2.9 km || 
|-id=099 bgcolor=#E9E9E9
| 535099 ||  || — || January 30, 2011 || Haleakala || Pan-STARRS ||  || align=right | 1.2 km || 
|-id=100 bgcolor=#E9E9E9
| 535100 ||  || — || February 26, 2008 || Mount Lemmon || Mount Lemmon Survey ||  || align=right data-sort-value="0.91" | 910 m || 
|}

535101–535200 

|-bgcolor=#E9E9E9
| 535101 ||  || — || January 30, 2011 || Haleakala || Pan-STARRS ||  || align=right | 1.3 km || 
|-id=102 bgcolor=#E9E9E9
| 535102 ||  || — || November 22, 2014 || Haleakala || Pan-STARRS ||  || align=right | 1.2 km || 
|-id=103 bgcolor=#E9E9E9
| 535103 ||  || — || November 22, 2014 || Haleakala || Pan-STARRS ||  || align=right data-sort-value="0.92" | 920 m || 
|-id=104 bgcolor=#E9E9E9
| 535104 ||  || — || February 25, 2011 || Mount Lemmon || Mount Lemmon Survey ||  || align=right | 1.8 km || 
|-id=105 bgcolor=#fefefe
| 535105 ||  || — || November 23, 2014 || Haleakala || Pan-STARRS ||  || align=right data-sort-value="0.63" | 630 m || 
|-id=106 bgcolor=#E9E9E9
| 535106 ||  || — || November 23, 2014 || Mount Lemmon || Mount Lemmon Survey ||  || align=right | 1.2 km || 
|-id=107 bgcolor=#E9E9E9
| 535107 ||  || — || November 23, 2014 || Haleakala || Pan-STARRS ||  || align=right | 1.0 km || 
|-id=108 bgcolor=#E9E9E9
| 535108 ||  || — || December 6, 2005 || Kitt Peak || Spacewatch ||  || align=right | 2.0 km || 
|-id=109 bgcolor=#E9E9E9
| 535109 ||  || — || April 14, 2008 || Mount Lemmon || Mount Lemmon Survey ||  || align=right | 1.1 km || 
|-id=110 bgcolor=#fefefe
| 535110 ||  || — || September 16, 2010 || Kitt Peak || Spacewatch ||  || align=right data-sort-value="0.65" | 650 m || 
|-id=111 bgcolor=#E9E9E9
| 535111 ||  || — || November 26, 2014 || Haleakala || Pan-STARRS ||  || align=right data-sort-value="0.85" | 850 m || 
|-id=112 bgcolor=#E9E9E9
| 535112 ||  || — || January 28, 2007 || Kitt Peak || Spacewatch ||  || align=right | 1.5 km || 
|-id=113 bgcolor=#E9E9E9
| 535113 ||  || — || March 9, 2011 || Mount Lemmon || Mount Lemmon Survey ||  || align=right | 1.8 km || 
|-id=114 bgcolor=#E9E9E9
| 535114 ||  || — || September 15, 2009 || Kitt Peak || Spacewatch ||  || align=right | 1.2 km || 
|-id=115 bgcolor=#E9E9E9
| 535115 ||  || — || November 26, 2014 || Haleakala || Pan-STARRS ||  || align=right | 1.1 km || 
|-id=116 bgcolor=#E9E9E9
| 535116 ||  || — || July 1, 2013 || Haleakala || Pan-STARRS ||  || align=right | 1.4 km || 
|-id=117 bgcolor=#E9E9E9
| 535117 ||  || — || November 30, 2010 || Mount Lemmon || Mount Lemmon Survey ||  || align=right | 1.3 km || 
|-id=118 bgcolor=#E9E9E9
| 535118 ||  || — || January 14, 2011 || Mount Lemmon || Mount Lemmon Survey ||  || align=right | 2.2 km || 
|-id=119 bgcolor=#E9E9E9
| 535119 ||  || — || November 27, 2014 || Mount Lemmon || Mount Lemmon Survey ||  || align=right | 1.1 km || 
|-id=120 bgcolor=#d6d6d6
| 535120 ||  || — || February 8, 2010 || WISE || WISE ||  || align=right | 3.2 km || 
|-id=121 bgcolor=#E9E9E9
| 535121 ||  || — || March 9, 2010 || WISE || WISE ||  || align=right | 2.4 km || 
|-id=122 bgcolor=#d6d6d6
| 535122 ||  || — || October 28, 2013 || Mount Lemmon || Mount Lemmon Survey ||  || align=right | 2.3 km || 
|-id=123 bgcolor=#d6d6d6
| 535123 ||  || — || November 27, 2014 || Haleakala || Pan-STARRS ||  || align=right | 2.2 km || 
|-id=124 bgcolor=#E9E9E9
| 535124 ||  || — || November 28, 2014 || Kitt Peak || Spacewatch ||  || align=right | 1.3 km || 
|-id=125 bgcolor=#E9E9E9
| 535125 ||  || — || January 30, 2011 || Mount Lemmon || Mount Lemmon Survey ||  || align=right | 1.1 km || 
|-id=126 bgcolor=#E9E9E9
| 535126 ||  || — || March 27, 2011 || Mount Lemmon || Mount Lemmon Survey ||  || align=right | 1.3 km || 
|-id=127 bgcolor=#E9E9E9
| 535127 ||  || — || November 9, 2009 || Kitt Peak || Spacewatch ||  || align=right | 1.6 km || 
|-id=128 bgcolor=#E9E9E9
| 535128 ||  || — || November 29, 2014 || Mount Lemmon || Mount Lemmon Survey ||  || align=right data-sort-value="0.75" | 750 m || 
|-id=129 bgcolor=#E9E9E9
| 535129 ||  || — || November 23, 2014 || Mount Lemmon || Mount Lemmon Survey ||  || align=right | 1.2 km || 
|-id=130 bgcolor=#E9E9E9
| 535130 ||  || — || December 14, 2006 || Mount Lemmon || Mount Lemmon Survey ||  || align=right data-sort-value="0.86" | 860 m || 
|-id=131 bgcolor=#E9E9E9
| 535131 ||  || — || October 21, 2009 || Mount Lemmon || Mount Lemmon Survey ||  || align=right | 1.5 km || 
|-id=132 bgcolor=#fefefe
| 535132 ||  || — || February 28, 2008 || Kitt Peak || Spacewatch ||  || align=right data-sort-value="0.73" | 730 m || 
|-id=133 bgcolor=#d6d6d6
| 535133 ||  || — || May 10, 2010 || WISE || WISE || Tj (2.98) || align=right | 5.3 km || 
|-id=134 bgcolor=#E9E9E9
| 535134 ||  || — || January 6, 2006 || Kitt Peak || Spacewatch ||  || align=right | 1.7 km || 
|-id=135 bgcolor=#E9E9E9
| 535135 ||  || — || November 30, 2014 || Haleakala || Pan-STARRS ||  || align=right | 1.3 km || 
|-id=136 bgcolor=#E9E9E9
| 535136 ||  || — || November 30, 2014 || Kitt Peak || Spacewatch ||  || align=right | 2.2 km || 
|-id=137 bgcolor=#E9E9E9
| 535137 ||  || — || November 30, 2014 || Haleakala || Pan-STARRS ||  || align=right | 1.9 km || 
|-id=138 bgcolor=#fefefe
| 535138 ||  || — || November 23, 2014 || Mount Lemmon || Mount Lemmon Survey ||  || align=right data-sort-value="0.60" | 600 m || 
|-id=139 bgcolor=#fefefe
| 535139 ||  || — || September 19, 2007 || Kitt Peak || Spacewatch ||  || align=right data-sort-value="0.62" | 620 m || 
|-id=140 bgcolor=#fefefe
| 535140 ||  || — || November 22, 2014 || Haleakala || Pan-STARRS ||  || align=right | 1.1 km || 
|-id=141 bgcolor=#E9E9E9
| 535141 ||  || — || November 25, 2014 || Haleakala || Pan-STARRS ||  || align=right data-sort-value="0.86" | 860 m || 
|-id=142 bgcolor=#fefefe
| 535142 ||  || — || November 5, 1996 || Kitt Peak || Spacewatch ||  || align=right data-sort-value="0.76" | 760 m || 
|-id=143 bgcolor=#fefefe
| 535143 ||  || — || November 17, 2014 || Haleakala || Pan-STARRS ||  || align=right data-sort-value="0.69" | 690 m || 
|-id=144 bgcolor=#E9E9E9
| 535144 ||  || — || January 6, 2010 || Mount Lemmon || Mount Lemmon Survey ||  || align=right | 3.1 km || 
|-id=145 bgcolor=#E9E9E9
| 535145 ||  || — || August 31, 2005 || Kitt Peak || Spacewatch ||  || align=right | 1.1 km || 
|-id=146 bgcolor=#E9E9E9
| 535146 ||  || — || October 29, 2014 || Catalina || CSS ||  || align=right | 1.2 km || 
|-id=147 bgcolor=#C2FFFF
| 535147 ||  || — || August 14, 2012 || Haleakala || Pan-STARRS || L5 || align=right | 7.2 km || 
|-id=148 bgcolor=#FFC2E0
| 535148 ||  || — || December 1, 2014 || Catalina || CSS || AMOcritical || align=right data-sort-value="0.86" | 860 m || 
|-id=149 bgcolor=#FA8072
| 535149 ||  || — || February 13, 2001 || Socorro || LINEAR ||  || align=right data-sort-value="0.76" | 760 m || 
|-id=150 bgcolor=#d6d6d6
| 535150 ||  || — || March 26, 2010 || WISE || WISE ||  || align=right | 3.5 km || 
|-id=151 bgcolor=#E9E9E9
| 535151 ||  || — || December 11, 2010 || Mount Lemmon || Mount Lemmon Survey ||  || align=right data-sort-value="0.87" | 870 m || 
|-id=152 bgcolor=#E9E9E9
| 535152 ||  || — || February 7, 2007 || Kitt Peak || Spacewatch ||  || align=right | 1.5 km || 
|-id=153 bgcolor=#E9E9E9
| 535153 ||  || — || December 14, 2001 || Socorro || LINEAR ||  || align=right | 1.2 km || 
|-id=154 bgcolor=#fefefe
| 535154 ||  || — || December 5, 2007 || Kitt Peak || Spacewatch ||  || align=right data-sort-value="0.49" | 490 m || 
|-id=155 bgcolor=#fefefe
| 535155 ||  || — || November 19, 2014 || Haleakala || Pan-STARRS ||  || align=right data-sort-value="0.60" | 600 m || 
|-id=156 bgcolor=#fefefe
| 535156 ||  || — || December 17, 2007 || Kitt Peak || Spacewatch ||  || align=right data-sort-value="0.56" | 560 m || 
|-id=157 bgcolor=#E9E9E9
| 535157 ||  || — || January 17, 2007 || Kitt Peak || Spacewatch ||  || align=right | 1.0 km || 
|-id=158 bgcolor=#E9E9E9
| 535158 ||  || — || September 16, 2009 || Mount Lemmon || Mount Lemmon Survey ||  || align=right | 1.9 km || 
|-id=159 bgcolor=#E9E9E9
| 535159 ||  || — || August 31, 2014 || Haleakala || Pan-STARRS ||  || align=right | 1.1 km || 
|-id=160 bgcolor=#E9E9E9
| 535160 ||  || — || July 31, 2005 || Socorro || LINEAR ||  || align=right | 2.2 km || 
|-id=161 bgcolor=#d6d6d6
| 535161 ||  || — || October 10, 2008 || Catalina || CSS ||  || align=right | 3.7 km || 
|-id=162 bgcolor=#fefefe
| 535162 ||  || — || December 15, 2014 || Mount Lemmon || Mount Lemmon Survey ||  || align=right data-sort-value="0.66" | 660 m || 
|-id=163 bgcolor=#E9E9E9
| 535163 ||  || — || November 11, 2001 || Anderson Mesa || LONEOS ||  || align=right | 1.8 km || 
|-id=164 bgcolor=#E9E9E9
| 535164 ||  || — || May 21, 2012 || Haleakala || Pan-STARRS ||  || align=right | 1.3 km || 
|-id=165 bgcolor=#E9E9E9
| 535165 ||  || — || September 25, 2014 || Mount Lemmon || Mount Lemmon Survey ||  || align=right | 1.1 km || 
|-id=166 bgcolor=#C2FFFF
| 535166 ||  || — || October 26, 2014 || Mount Lemmon || Mount Lemmon Survey || L5 || align=right | 9.5 km || 
|-id=167 bgcolor=#C2E0FF
| 535167 ||  || — || October 8, 2010 || Haleakala || Pan-STARRS || plutino || align=right | 154 km || 
|-id=168 bgcolor=#C2E0FF
| 535168 ||  || — || October 25, 2011 || Haleakala || Pan-STARRS || plutino || align=right | 163 km || 
|-id=169 bgcolor=#C2E0FF
| 535169 ||  || — || January 20, 2012 || Haleakala || Pan-STARRS || SDO || align=right | 150 km || 
|-id=170 bgcolor=#fefefe
| 535170 ||  || — || March 2, 2008 || Kitt Peak || Spacewatch ||  || align=right data-sort-value="0.93" | 930 m || 
|-id=171 bgcolor=#d6d6d6
| 535171 ||  || — || March 9, 2011 || Mount Lemmon || Mount Lemmon Survey ||  || align=right | 2.4 km || 
|-id=172 bgcolor=#E9E9E9
| 535172 ||  || — || December 12, 2014 || Haleakala || Pan-STARRS ||  || align=right | 1.6 km || 
|-id=173 bgcolor=#E9E9E9
| 535173 ||  || — || December 13, 2006 || Kitt Peak || Spacewatch ||  || align=right data-sort-value="0.94" | 940 m || 
|-id=174 bgcolor=#E9E9E9
| 535174 ||  || — || October 30, 2014 || Mount Lemmon || Mount Lemmon Survey ||  || align=right | 1.2 km || 
|-id=175 bgcolor=#E9E9E9
| 535175 ||  || — || September 23, 2013 || Mount Lemmon || Mount Lemmon Survey ||  || align=right | 2.0 km || 
|-id=176 bgcolor=#d6d6d6
| 535176 ||  || — || January 27, 2010 || WISE || WISE ||  || align=right | 3.1 km || 
|-id=177 bgcolor=#d6d6d6
| 535177 ||  || — || November 12, 2013 || Kitt Peak || Spacewatch ||  || align=right | 3.4 km || 
|-id=178 bgcolor=#E9E9E9
| 535178 ||  || — || March 26, 2011 || Mount Lemmon || Mount Lemmon Survey ||  || align=right | 2.1 km || 
|-id=179 bgcolor=#E9E9E9
| 535179 ||  || — || December 10, 2010 || Mount Lemmon || Mount Lemmon Survey ||  || align=right | 1.5 km || 
|-id=180 bgcolor=#E9E9E9
| 535180 ||  || — || December 10, 2014 || Mount Lemmon || Mount Lemmon Survey ||  || align=right | 1.4 km || 
|-id=181 bgcolor=#E9E9E9
| 535181 ||  || — || December 11, 2014 || Mount Lemmon || Mount Lemmon Survey ||  || align=right | 1.5 km || 
|-id=182 bgcolor=#fefefe
| 535182 ||  || — || January 3, 2012 || Mount Lemmon || Mount Lemmon Survey ||  || align=right data-sort-value="0.56" | 560 m || 
|-id=183 bgcolor=#E9E9E9
| 535183 ||  || — || December 12, 2014 || Haleakala || Pan-STARRS ||  || align=right | 1.3 km || 
|-id=184 bgcolor=#E9E9E9
| 535184 ||  || — || December 6, 2005 || Kitt Peak || Spacewatch ||  || align=right | 2.3 km || 
|-id=185 bgcolor=#E9E9E9
| 535185 ||  || — || December 12, 2014 || Haleakala || Pan-STARRS ||  || align=right | 1.2 km || 
|-id=186 bgcolor=#E9E9E9
| 535186 ||  || — || August 30, 2013 || Haleakala || Pan-STARRS ||  || align=right | 1.7 km || 
|-id=187 bgcolor=#fefefe
| 535187 ||  || — || August 15, 2013 || Haleakala || Pan-STARRS ||  || align=right data-sort-value="0.86" | 860 m || 
|-id=188 bgcolor=#E9E9E9
| 535188 ||  || — || October 26, 2014 || Mount Lemmon || Mount Lemmon Survey ||  || align=right | 1.7 km || 
|-id=189 bgcolor=#E9E9E9
| 535189 ||  || — || December 10, 2010 || Mount Lemmon || Mount Lemmon Survey ||  || align=right data-sort-value="0.81" | 810 m || 
|-id=190 bgcolor=#E9E9E9
| 535190 ||  || — || October 15, 2013 || Mount Lemmon || Mount Lemmon Survey ||  || align=right | 2.1 km || 
|-id=191 bgcolor=#E9E9E9
| 535191 ||  || — || October 27, 2005 || Kitt Peak || Spacewatch ||  || align=right data-sort-value="0.94" | 940 m || 
|-id=192 bgcolor=#d6d6d6
| 535192 ||  || — || November 4, 2013 || Mount Lemmon || Mount Lemmon Survey ||  || align=right | 2.5 km || 
|-id=193 bgcolor=#E9E9E9
| 535193 ||  || — || December 11, 2009 || Mount Lemmon || Mount Lemmon Survey ||  || align=right | 2.4 km || 
|-id=194 bgcolor=#d6d6d6
| 535194 ||  || — || March 2, 2006 || Kitt Peak || Spacewatch ||  || align=right | 2.0 km || 
|-id=195 bgcolor=#fefefe
| 535195 ||  || — || January 1, 2008 || Kitt Peak || Spacewatch ||  || align=right data-sort-value="0.58" | 580 m || 
|-id=196 bgcolor=#E9E9E9
| 535196 ||  || — || January 30, 2011 || Haleakala || Pan-STARRS ||  || align=right | 1.6 km || 
|-id=197 bgcolor=#E9E9E9
| 535197 ||  || — || November 16, 2010 || Mount Lemmon || Mount Lemmon Survey ||  || align=right | 1.2 km || 
|-id=198 bgcolor=#E9E9E9
| 535198 ||  || — || October 28, 2014 || Haleakala || Pan-STARRS ||  || align=right | 1.1 km || 
|-id=199 bgcolor=#E9E9E9
| 535199 ||  || — || October 14, 2010 || Mount Lemmon || Mount Lemmon Survey ||  || align=right | 1.6 km || 
|-id=200 bgcolor=#d6d6d6
| 535200 ||  || — || May 8, 2010 || WISE || WISE ||  || align=right | 2.5 km || 
|}

535201–535300 

|-bgcolor=#E9E9E9
| 535201 ||  || — || November 15, 2006 || Mount Lemmon || Mount Lemmon Survey ||  || align=right data-sort-value="0.92" | 920 m || 
|-id=202 bgcolor=#E9E9E9
| 535202 ||  || — || November 10, 2009 || Mount Lemmon || Mount Lemmon Survey ||  || align=right | 2.1 km || 
|-id=203 bgcolor=#FA8072
| 535203 ||  || — || September 10, 2001 || Socorro || LINEAR ||  || align=right | 1.8 km || 
|-id=204 bgcolor=#d6d6d6
| 535204 ||  || — || March 31, 2010 || WISE || WISE ||  || align=right | 3.0 km || 
|-id=205 bgcolor=#E9E9E9
| 535205 ||  || — || December 30, 2005 || Kitt Peak || Spacewatch ||  || align=right | 2.4 km || 
|-id=206 bgcolor=#fefefe
| 535206 ||  || — || May 17, 2012 || Mount Lemmon || Mount Lemmon Survey ||  || align=right data-sort-value="0.86" | 860 m || 
|-id=207 bgcolor=#E9E9E9
| 535207 ||  || — || December 25, 2005 || Mount Lemmon || Mount Lemmon Survey ||  || align=right | 2.4 km || 
|-id=208 bgcolor=#d6d6d6
| 535208 ||  || — || January 7, 1999 || Kitt Peak || Spacewatch ||  || align=right | 3.5 km || 
|-id=209 bgcolor=#d6d6d6
| 535209 ||  || — || December 21, 2003 || Kitt Peak || Spacewatch ||  || align=right | 3.6 km || 
|-id=210 bgcolor=#E9E9E9
| 535210 ||  || — || November 26, 2014 || Mount Lemmon || Mount Lemmon Survey ||  || align=right | 1.2 km || 
|-id=211 bgcolor=#E9E9E9
| 535211 ||  || — || November 15, 2010 || Mount Lemmon || Mount Lemmon Survey ||  || align=right | 1.7 km || 
|-id=212 bgcolor=#fefefe
| 535212 ||  || — || September 12, 2013 || Mount Lemmon || Mount Lemmon Survey ||  || align=right | 1.0 km || 
|-id=213 bgcolor=#E9E9E9
| 535213 ||  || — || September 24, 1973 || Palomar || PLS ||  || align=right | 1.2 km || 
|-id=214 bgcolor=#d6d6d6
| 535214 ||  || — || September 3, 2008 || Kitt Peak || Spacewatch ||  || align=right | 2.6 km || 
|-id=215 bgcolor=#E9E9E9
| 535215 ||  || — || September 23, 2009 || Kitt Peak || Spacewatch ||  || align=right data-sort-value="0.98" | 980 m || 
|-id=216 bgcolor=#E9E9E9
| 535216 ||  || — || October 24, 2009 || Kitt Peak || Spacewatch ||  || align=right | 1.6 km || 
|-id=217 bgcolor=#E9E9E9
| 535217 ||  || — || January 10, 2011 || Mount Lemmon || Mount Lemmon Survey ||  || align=right data-sort-value="0.94" | 940 m || 
|-id=218 bgcolor=#fefefe
| 535218 ||  || — || January 1, 2008 || Kitt Peak || Spacewatch ||  || align=right data-sort-value="0.60" | 600 m || 
|-id=219 bgcolor=#E9E9E9
| 535219 ||  || — || October 14, 2009 || Mount Lemmon || Mount Lemmon Survey ||  || align=right | 2.2 km || 
|-id=220 bgcolor=#fefefe
| 535220 ||  || — || December 18, 2014 || Haleakala || Pan-STARRS ||  || align=right data-sort-value="0.81" | 810 m || 
|-id=221 bgcolor=#FFC2E0
| 535221 ||  || — || December 29, 2014 || Haleakala || Pan-STARRS || AMO || align=right data-sort-value="0.55" | 550 m || 
|-id=222 bgcolor=#E9E9E9
| 535222 ||  || — || December 21, 2006 || Mount Lemmon || Mount Lemmon Survey ||  || align=right data-sort-value="0.88" | 880 m || 
|-id=223 bgcolor=#E9E9E9
| 535223 ||  || — || April 8, 2008 || Mount Lemmon || Mount Lemmon Survey ||  || align=right | 1.1 km || 
|-id=224 bgcolor=#E9E9E9
| 535224 ||  || — || January 13, 2011 || Catalina || CSS ||  || align=right data-sort-value="0.99" | 990 m || 
|-id=225 bgcolor=#E9E9E9
| 535225 ||  || — || November 6, 2005 || Mount Lemmon || Mount Lemmon Survey ||  || align=right | 1.7 km || 
|-id=226 bgcolor=#E9E9E9
| 535226 ||  || — || October 11, 2010 || Kitt Peak || Spacewatch ||  || align=right | 3.5 km || 
|-id=227 bgcolor=#E9E9E9
| 535227 ||  || — || March 6, 2011 || Kitt Peak || Spacewatch ||  || align=right | 2.3 km || 
|-id=228 bgcolor=#C2E0FF
| 535228 ||  || — || April 3, 2010 || Haleakala || Pan-STARRS || SDO || align=right | 346 km || 
|-id=229 bgcolor=#C2E0FF
| 535229 ||  || — || December 23, 2011 || Haleakala || Pan-STARRS || plutinocritical || align=right | 159 km || 
|-id=230 bgcolor=#C2E0FF
| 535230 ||  || — || November 9, 2010 || Haleakala || Pan-STARRS || SDOcritical || align=right | 249 km || 
|-id=231 bgcolor=#C2E0FF
| 535231 ||  || — || November 15, 2010 || Haleakala || Pan-STARRS || plutino || align=right | 190 km || 
|-id=232 bgcolor=#E9E9E9
| 535232 ||  || — || November 22, 2014 || Mount Lemmon || Mount Lemmon Survey ||  || align=right | 2.4 km || 
|-id=233 bgcolor=#d6d6d6
| 535233 ||  || — || March 4, 2005 || Mount Lemmon || Mount Lemmon Survey ||  || align=right | 2.9 km || 
|-id=234 bgcolor=#d6d6d6
| 535234 ||  || — || March 17, 2005 || Mount Lemmon || Mount Lemmon Survey ||  || align=right | 3.3 km || 
|-id=235 bgcolor=#E9E9E9
| 535235 ||  || — || January 30, 2011 || Kitt Peak || Spacewatch ||  || align=right | 1.9 km || 
|-id=236 bgcolor=#d6d6d6
| 535236 ||  || — || December 29, 2014 || Haleakala || Pan-STARRS ||  || align=right | 2.3 km || 
|-id=237 bgcolor=#E9E9E9
| 535237 ||  || — || April 27, 2012 || Haleakala || Pan-STARRS ||  || align=right data-sort-value="0.93" | 930 m || 
|-id=238 bgcolor=#E9E9E9
| 535238 ||  || — || October 7, 2004 || Anderson Mesa || LONEOS ||  || align=right | 2.5 km || 
|-id=239 bgcolor=#d6d6d6
| 535239 ||  || — || December 29, 2014 || Haleakala || Pan-STARRS ||  || align=right | 3.6 km || 
|-id=240 bgcolor=#E9E9E9
| 535240 ||  || — || December 24, 2014 || Mount Lemmon || Mount Lemmon Survey ||  || align=right | 1.7 km || 
|-id=241 bgcolor=#E9E9E9
| 535241 ||  || — || November 22, 2006 || Mount Lemmon || Mount Lemmon Survey ||  || align=right | 1.1 km || 
|-id=242 bgcolor=#fefefe
| 535242 ||  || — || November 11, 2006 || Mount Lemmon || Mount Lemmon Survey ||  || align=right data-sort-value="0.73" | 730 m || 
|-id=243 bgcolor=#fefefe
| 535243 ||  || — || November 19, 2014 || Mount Lemmon || Mount Lemmon Survey ||  || align=right data-sort-value="0.78" | 780 m || 
|-id=244 bgcolor=#E9E9E9
| 535244 ||  || — || December 29, 2014 || Haleakala || Pan-STARRS ||  || align=right data-sort-value="0.94" | 940 m || 
|-id=245 bgcolor=#E9E9E9
| 535245 ||  || — || January 8, 2011 || Mount Lemmon || Mount Lemmon Survey ||  || align=right | 1.5 km || 
|-id=246 bgcolor=#fefefe
| 535246 ||  || — || March 15, 2008 || Kitt Peak || Spacewatch ||  || align=right data-sort-value="0.98" | 980 m || 
|-id=247 bgcolor=#E9E9E9
| 535247 ||  || — || January 13, 2011 || Kitt Peak || Spacewatch ||  || align=right | 1.4 km || 
|-id=248 bgcolor=#E9E9E9
| 535248 ||  || — || March 25, 2007 || Mount Lemmon || Mount Lemmon Survey ||  || align=right | 2.6 km || 
|-id=249 bgcolor=#E9E9E9
| 535249 ||  || — || March 10, 2007 || Mount Lemmon || Mount Lemmon Survey ||  || align=right | 1.5 km || 
|-id=250 bgcolor=#E9E9E9
| 535250 ||  || — || April 25, 2007 || Mount Lemmon || Mount Lemmon Survey ||  || align=right | 1.4 km || 
|-id=251 bgcolor=#d6d6d6
| 535251 ||  || — || April 9, 2010 || Mount Lemmon || Mount Lemmon Survey ||  || align=right | 2.9 km || 
|-id=252 bgcolor=#fefefe
| 535252 ||  || — || April 15, 2008 || Mount Lemmon || Mount Lemmon Survey ||  || align=right data-sort-value="0.63" | 630 m || 
|-id=253 bgcolor=#E9E9E9
| 535253 ||  || — || December 27, 2014 || Haleakala || Pan-STARRS ||  || align=right | 1.1 km || 
|-id=254 bgcolor=#fefefe
| 535254 ||  || — || November 3, 2010 || Mount Lemmon || Mount Lemmon Survey ||  || align=right data-sort-value="0.81" | 810 m || 
|-id=255 bgcolor=#fefefe
| 535255 ||  || — || September 3, 2013 || Haleakala || Pan-STARRS ||  || align=right data-sort-value="0.91" | 910 m || 
|-id=256 bgcolor=#fefefe
| 535256 ||  || — || October 13, 2010 || Mount Lemmon || Mount Lemmon Survey ||  || align=right data-sort-value="0.55" | 550 m || 
|-id=257 bgcolor=#d6d6d6
| 535257 ||  || — || September 6, 2008 || Mount Lemmon || Mount Lemmon Survey ||  || align=right | 1.6 km || 
|-id=258 bgcolor=#E9E9E9
| 535258 ||  || — || December 21, 2014 || Haleakala || Pan-STARRS ||  || align=right | 2.3 km || 
|-id=259 bgcolor=#d6d6d6
| 535259 ||  || — || November 27, 2013 || Haleakala || Pan-STARRS ||  || align=right | 2.4 km || 
|-id=260 bgcolor=#d6d6d6
| 535260 ||  || — || October 4, 2013 || Mount Lemmon || Mount Lemmon Survey ||  || align=right | 2.4 km || 
|-id=261 bgcolor=#E9E9E9
| 535261 ||  || — || September 22, 2009 || Mount Lemmon || Mount Lemmon Survey ||  || align=right | 2.0 km || 
|-id=262 bgcolor=#E9E9E9
| 535262 ||  || — || November 21, 2009 || Kitt Peak || Spacewatch ||  || align=right | 1.9 km || 
|-id=263 bgcolor=#E9E9E9
| 535263 ||  || — || October 23, 2009 || Kitt Peak || Spacewatch ||  || align=right | 1.5 km || 
|-id=264 bgcolor=#fefefe
| 535264 ||  || — || September 3, 2013 || Haleakala || Pan-STARRS ||  || align=right data-sort-value="0.54" | 540 m || 
|-id=265 bgcolor=#E9E9E9
| 535265 ||  || — || August 7, 2013 || Haleakala || Pan-STARRS ||  || align=right | 2.5 km || 
|-id=266 bgcolor=#d6d6d6
| 535266 ||  || — || September 9, 2013 || Haleakala || Pan-STARRS ||  || align=right | 2.4 km || 
|-id=267 bgcolor=#E9E9E9
| 535267 ||  || — || October 9, 2013 || Mount Lemmon || Mount Lemmon Survey ||  || align=right data-sort-value="0.93" | 930 m || 
|-id=268 bgcolor=#fefefe
| 535268 ||  || — || October 21, 2003 || Kitt Peak || Spacewatch ||  || align=right data-sort-value="0.77" | 770 m || 
|-id=269 bgcolor=#d6d6d6
| 535269 ||  || — || September 27, 2003 || Kitt Peak || Spacewatch ||  || align=right | 2.2 km || 
|-id=270 bgcolor=#E9E9E9
| 535270 ||  || — || March 4, 2011 || Kitt Peak || Spacewatch ||  || align=right | 1.8 km || 
|-id=271 bgcolor=#E9E9E9
| 535271 ||  || — || February 12, 2011 || Mount Lemmon || Mount Lemmon Survey ||  || align=right | 1.5 km || 
|-id=272 bgcolor=#d6d6d6
| 535272 ||  || — || January 6, 2010 || Mount Lemmon || Mount Lemmon Survey ||  || align=right | 2.3 km || 
|-id=273 bgcolor=#fefefe
| 535273 ||  || — || November 12, 2010 || Mount Lemmon || Mount Lemmon Survey ||  || align=right data-sort-value="0.86" | 860 m || 
|-id=274 bgcolor=#d6d6d6
| 535274 ||  || — || October 9, 2008 || Mount Lemmon || Mount Lemmon Survey ||  || align=right | 2.9 km || 
|-id=275 bgcolor=#E9E9E9
| 535275 ||  || — || February 4, 2006 || Kitt Peak || Spacewatch ||  || align=right | 1.9 km || 
|-id=276 bgcolor=#d6d6d6
| 535276 ||  || — || October 23, 2008 || Kitt Peak || Spacewatch ||  || align=right | 3.1 km || 
|-id=277 bgcolor=#E9E9E9
| 535277 ||  || — || December 21, 2014 || Mount Lemmon || Mount Lemmon Survey ||  || align=right | 1.4 km || 
|-id=278 bgcolor=#E9E9E9
| 535278 ||  || — || September 2, 2013 || Mount Lemmon || Mount Lemmon Survey ||  || align=right | 1.2 km || 
|-id=279 bgcolor=#d6d6d6
| 535279 ||  || — || December 21, 2014 || Mount Lemmon || Mount Lemmon Survey ||  || align=right | 2.8 km || 
|-id=280 bgcolor=#d6d6d6
| 535280 ||  || — || November 22, 2008 || Mount Lemmon || Mount Lemmon Survey ||  || align=right | 2.7 km || 
|-id=281 bgcolor=#E9E9E9
| 535281 ||  || — || January 23, 2006 || Kitt Peak || Spacewatch ||  || align=right | 1.4 km || 
|-id=282 bgcolor=#fefefe
| 535282 ||  || — || November 1, 2006 || Kitt Peak || Spacewatch ||  || align=right data-sort-value="0.54" | 540 m || 
|-id=283 bgcolor=#fefefe
| 535283 ||  || — || April 19, 2012 || Kitt Peak || Spacewatch ||  || align=right data-sort-value="0.79" | 790 m || 
|-id=284 bgcolor=#d6d6d6
| 535284 ||  || — || September 4, 2008 || Kitt Peak || Spacewatch ||  || align=right | 1.9 km || 
|-id=285 bgcolor=#E9E9E9
| 535285 ||  || — || January 27, 2007 || Kitt Peak || Spacewatch ||  || align=right data-sort-value="0.77" | 770 m || 
|-id=286 bgcolor=#E9E9E9
| 535286 ||  || — || September 3, 2008 || Kitt Peak || Spacewatch ||  || align=right | 1.9 km || 
|-id=287 bgcolor=#E9E9E9
| 535287 ||  || — || October 28, 2005 || Mount Lemmon || Mount Lemmon Survey ||  || align=right | 1.0 km || 
|-id=288 bgcolor=#d6d6d6
| 535288 ||  || — || December 26, 2014 || Haleakala || Pan-STARRS ||  || align=right | 2.3 km || 
|-id=289 bgcolor=#E9E9E9
| 535289 ||  || — || December 26, 2014 || Haleakala || Pan-STARRS ||  || align=right | 1.2 km || 
|-id=290 bgcolor=#E9E9E9
| 535290 ||  || — || November 22, 2005 || Kitt Peak || Spacewatch ||  || align=right data-sort-value="0.96" | 960 m || 
|-id=291 bgcolor=#fefefe
| 535291 ||  || — || November 19, 2014 || Mount Lemmon || Mount Lemmon Survey ||  || align=right data-sort-value="0.62" | 620 m || 
|-id=292 bgcolor=#E9E9E9
| 535292 ||  || — || September 10, 2013 || Haleakala || Pan-STARRS ||  || align=right | 1.9 km || 
|-id=293 bgcolor=#E9E9E9
| 535293 ||  || — || December 20, 2014 || Kitt Peak || Spacewatch ||  || align=right | 1.1 km || 
|-id=294 bgcolor=#d6d6d6
| 535294 ||  || — || October 2, 2013 || Haleakala || Pan-STARRS ||  || align=right | 2.1 km || 
|-id=295 bgcolor=#E9E9E9
| 535295 ||  || — || December 29, 2014 || Haleakala || Pan-STARRS ||  || align=right | 2.0 km || 
|-id=296 bgcolor=#d6d6d6
| 535296 ||  || — || December 29, 2014 || Haleakala || Pan-STARRS ||  || align=right | 2.9 km || 
|-id=297 bgcolor=#d6d6d6
| 535297 ||  || — || December 29, 2014 || Haleakala || Pan-STARRS ||  || align=right | 2.7 km || 
|-id=298 bgcolor=#d6d6d6
| 535298 ||  || — || December 29, 2014 || Haleakala || Pan-STARRS ||  || align=right | 3.3 km || 
|-id=299 bgcolor=#E9E9E9
| 535299 ||  || — || February 5, 2011 || Mount Lemmon || Mount Lemmon Survey ||  || align=right | 1.1 km || 
|-id=300 bgcolor=#E9E9E9
| 535300 ||  || — || December 29, 2014 || Haleakala || Pan-STARRS ||  || align=right data-sort-value="0.81" | 810 m || 
|}

535301–535400 

|-bgcolor=#d6d6d6
| 535301 ||  || — || April 9, 2010 || Mount Lemmon || Mount Lemmon Survey ||  || align=right | 2.9 km || 
|-id=302 bgcolor=#d6d6d6
| 535302 ||  || — || January 15, 2010 || WISE || WISE ||  || align=right | 3.4 km || 
|-id=303 bgcolor=#d6d6d6
| 535303 ||  || — || December 29, 2014 || Haleakala || Pan-STARRS ||  || align=right | 2.8 km || 
|-id=304 bgcolor=#d6d6d6
| 535304 ||  || — || December 29, 2014 || Mount Lemmon || Mount Lemmon Survey ||  || align=right | 2.5 km || 
|-id=305 bgcolor=#d6d6d6
| 535305 ||  || — || February 10, 2010 || Kitt Peak || Spacewatch ||  || align=right | 3.2 km || 
|-id=306 bgcolor=#E9E9E9
| 535306 ||  || — || August 31, 2014 || Haleakala || Pan-STARRS ||  || align=right data-sort-value="0.98" | 980 m || 
|-id=307 bgcolor=#E9E9E9
| 535307 ||  || — || October 27, 2014 || Haleakala || Pan-STARRS ||  || align=right | 2.0 km || 
|-id=308 bgcolor=#C2FFFF
| 535308 ||  || — || May 14, 2008 || Mount Lemmon || Mount Lemmon Survey || L5 || align=right | 9.9 km || 
|-id=309 bgcolor=#E9E9E9
| 535309 ||  || — || November 23, 2014 || Haleakala || Pan-STARRS ||  || align=right data-sort-value="0.90" | 900 m || 
|-id=310 bgcolor=#E9E9E9
| 535310 ||  || — || September 14, 2013 || Haleakala || Pan-STARRS ||  || align=right | 2.4 km || 
|-id=311 bgcolor=#E9E9E9
| 535311 ||  || — || January 10, 2007 || Mount Lemmon || Mount Lemmon Survey ||  || align=right | 1.3 km || 
|-id=312 bgcolor=#fefefe
| 535312 ||  || — || September 20, 2014 || Haleakala || Pan-STARRS ||  || align=right data-sort-value="0.66" | 660 m || 
|-id=313 bgcolor=#E9E9E9
| 535313 ||  || — || March 16, 2012 || Mount Lemmon || Mount Lemmon Survey ||  || align=right | 1.2 km || 
|-id=314 bgcolor=#d6d6d6
| 535314 ||  || — || April 7, 2005 || Mount Lemmon || Mount Lemmon Survey ||  || align=right | 3.2 km || 
|-id=315 bgcolor=#E9E9E9
| 535315 ||  || — || July 31, 2009 || Siding Spring || SSS ||  || align=right | 1.6 km || 
|-id=316 bgcolor=#E9E9E9
| 535316 ||  || — || November 23, 2009 || Mount Lemmon || Mount Lemmon Survey ||  || align=right | 2.0 km || 
|-id=317 bgcolor=#E9E9E9
| 535317 ||  || — || September 25, 2009 || Kitt Peak || Spacewatch ||  || align=right | 1.3 km || 
|-id=318 bgcolor=#E9E9E9
| 535318 ||  || — || December 5, 2005 || Kitt Peak || Spacewatch ||  || align=right | 1.8 km || 
|-id=319 bgcolor=#d6d6d6
| 535319 ||  || — || May 19, 2010 || WISE || WISE ||  || align=right | 5.3 km || 
|-id=320 bgcolor=#E9E9E9
| 535320 ||  || — || November 8, 2009 || Catalina || CSS ||  || align=right | 1.9 km || 
|-id=321 bgcolor=#E9E9E9
| 535321 ||  || — || November 21, 2014 || Haleakala || Pan-STARRS ||  || align=right | 1.1 km || 
|-id=322 bgcolor=#E9E9E9
| 535322 ||  || — || September 17, 2009 || Kitt Peak || Spacewatch ||  || align=right | 1.9 km || 
|-id=323 bgcolor=#fefefe
| 535323 ||  || — || December 26, 2014 || Haleakala || Pan-STARRS ||  || align=right data-sort-value="0.96" | 960 m || 
|-id=324 bgcolor=#E9E9E9
| 535324 ||  || — || February 22, 2007 || Kitt Peak || Spacewatch ||  || align=right | 1.3 km || 
|-id=325 bgcolor=#E9E9E9
| 535325 ||  || — || May 30, 2008 || Kitt Peak || Spacewatch ||  || align=right | 1.6 km || 
|-id=326 bgcolor=#fefefe
| 535326 ||  || — || November 28, 2014 || Mount Lemmon || Mount Lemmon Survey ||  || align=right data-sort-value="0.79" | 790 m || 
|-id=327 bgcolor=#E9E9E9
| 535327 ||  || — || December 17, 2006 || Mount Lemmon || Mount Lemmon Survey ||  || align=right data-sort-value="0.96" | 960 m || 
|-id=328 bgcolor=#E9E9E9
| 535328 ||  || — || October 5, 2014 || Mount Lemmon || Mount Lemmon Survey ||  || align=right | 1.9 km || 
|-id=329 bgcolor=#d6d6d6
| 535329 ||  || — || November 29, 2013 || Haleakala || Pan-STARRS ||  || align=right | 2.8 km || 
|-id=330 bgcolor=#E9E9E9
| 535330 ||  || — || November 29, 2014 || Haleakala || Pan-STARRS ||  || align=right | 1.2 km || 
|-id=331 bgcolor=#fefefe
| 535331 ||  || — || March 28, 2008 || Mount Lemmon || Mount Lemmon Survey ||  || align=right data-sort-value="0.63" | 630 m || 
|-id=332 bgcolor=#E9E9E9
| 535332 ||  || — || December 25, 2005 || Mount Lemmon || Mount Lemmon Survey ||  || align=right | 2.0 km || 
|-id=333 bgcolor=#d6d6d6
| 535333 ||  || — || October 28, 2014 || Haleakala || Pan-STARRS ||  || align=right | 2.6 km || 
|-id=334 bgcolor=#d6d6d6
| 535334 ||  || — || March 3, 2006 || Mount Lemmon || Mount Lemmon Survey ||  || align=right | 2.0 km || 
|-id=335 bgcolor=#E9E9E9
| 535335 ||  || — || January 8, 2011 || Mount Lemmon || Mount Lemmon Survey ||  || align=right | 1.7 km || 
|-id=336 bgcolor=#d6d6d6
| 535336 ||  || — || December 21, 2014 || Haleakala || Pan-STARRS ||  || align=right | 1.8 km || 
|-id=337 bgcolor=#d6d6d6
| 535337 ||  || — || December 21, 2014 || Haleakala || Pan-STARRS ||  || align=right | 2.7 km || 
|-id=338 bgcolor=#E9E9E9
| 535338 ||  || — || November 10, 2009 || Kitt Peak || Spacewatch ||  || align=right | 1.4 km || 
|-id=339 bgcolor=#E9E9E9
| 535339 ||  || — || January 4, 2006 || Kitt Peak || Spacewatch ||  || align=right | 2.5 km || 
|-id=340 bgcolor=#E9E9E9
| 535340 ||  || — || January 26, 2007 || Kitt Peak || Spacewatch ||  || align=right data-sort-value="0.72" | 720 m || 
|-id=341 bgcolor=#fefefe
| 535341 ||  || — || July 29, 2010 || WISE || WISE ||  || align=right data-sort-value="0.61" | 610 m || 
|-id=342 bgcolor=#E9E9E9
| 535342 ||  || — || November 4, 2014 || Haleakala || Pan-STARRS ||  || align=right | 1.2 km || 
|-id=343 bgcolor=#E9E9E9
| 535343 ||  || — || October 3, 2005 || Kitt Peak || Spacewatch ||  || align=right | 1.0 km || 
|-id=344 bgcolor=#fefefe
| 535344 ||  || — || March 3, 2000 || Kitt Peak || Spacewatch ||  || align=right data-sort-value="0.69" | 690 m || 
|-id=345 bgcolor=#E9E9E9
| 535345 ||  || — || December 19, 2001 || Kitt Peak || Spacewatch ||  || align=right | 1.1 km || 
|-id=346 bgcolor=#E9E9E9
| 535346 ||  || — || November 19, 2009 || Mount Lemmon || Mount Lemmon Survey ||  || align=right | 1.7 km || 
|-id=347 bgcolor=#E9E9E9
| 535347 ||  || — || November 17, 2009 || Kitt Peak || Spacewatch ||  || align=right | 1.8 km || 
|-id=348 bgcolor=#E9E9E9
| 535348 ||  || — || January 2, 2006 || Mount Lemmon || Mount Lemmon Survey ||  || align=right | 2.0 km || 
|-id=349 bgcolor=#E9E9E9
| 535349 ||  || — || July 14, 2013 || Haleakala || Pan-STARRS ||  || align=right data-sort-value="0.86" | 860 m || 
|-id=350 bgcolor=#d6d6d6
| 535350 ||  || — || December 1, 2008 || Mount Lemmon || Mount Lemmon Survey ||  || align=right | 3.1 km || 
|-id=351 bgcolor=#fefefe
| 535351 ||  || — || October 20, 2006 || Mount Lemmon || Mount Lemmon Survey ||  || align=right data-sort-value="0.81" | 810 m || 
|-id=352 bgcolor=#d6d6d6
| 535352 ||  || — || February 15, 2010 || Mount Lemmon || Mount Lemmon Survey ||  || align=right | 4.2 km || 
|-id=353 bgcolor=#E9E9E9
| 535353 Antoniwilk ||  ||  || April 11, 2007 || Catalina || CSS ||  || align=right | 1.5 km || 
|-id=354 bgcolor=#d6d6d6
| 535354 ||  || — || January 6, 2000 || Kitt Peak || Spacewatch ||  || align=right | 3.0 km || 
|-id=355 bgcolor=#E9E9E9
| 535355 ||  || — || December 25, 2005 || Kitt Peak || Spacewatch ||  || align=right | 1.5 km || 
|-id=356 bgcolor=#E9E9E9
| 535356 ||  || — || January 23, 2006 || Mount Lemmon || Mount Lemmon Survey ||  || align=right | 2.2 km || 
|-id=357 bgcolor=#E9E9E9
| 535357 ||  || — || September 3, 2013 || Mount Lemmon || Mount Lemmon Survey ||  || align=right | 1.7 km || 
|-id=358 bgcolor=#E9E9E9
| 535358 ||  || — || July 15, 2013 || Haleakala || Pan-STARRS ||  || align=right | 1.1 km || 
|-id=359 bgcolor=#d6d6d6
| 535359 ||  || — || May 24, 2011 || Haleakala || Pan-STARRS ||  || align=right | 2.7 km || 
|-id=360 bgcolor=#E9E9E9
| 535360 ||  || — || August 20, 2004 || Kitt Peak || Spacewatch ||  || align=right | 1.8 km || 
|-id=361 bgcolor=#E9E9E9
| 535361 ||  || — || January 13, 2015 || Haleakala || Pan-STARRS ||  || align=right | 1.5 km || 
|-id=362 bgcolor=#fefefe
| 535362 ||  || — || December 21, 2014 || Haleakala || Pan-STARRS ||  || align=right data-sort-value="0.55" | 550 m || 
|-id=363 bgcolor=#E9E9E9
| 535363 ||  || — || January 27, 2011 || Mount Lemmon || Mount Lemmon Survey ||  || align=right data-sort-value="0.72" | 720 m || 
|-id=364 bgcolor=#E9E9E9
| 535364 ||  || — || January 25, 2007 || Kitt Peak || Spacewatch ||  || align=right data-sort-value="0.94" | 940 m || 
|-id=365 bgcolor=#d6d6d6
| 535365 ||  || — || November 30, 2014 || Haleakala || Pan-STARRS ||  || align=right | 2.5 km || 
|-id=366 bgcolor=#E9E9E9
| 535366 ||  || — || December 27, 2014 || Haleakala || Pan-STARRS ||  || align=right | 1.2 km || 
|-id=367 bgcolor=#fefefe
| 535367 ||  || — || January 14, 2015 || Haleakala || Pan-STARRS ||  || align=right data-sort-value="0.75" | 750 m || 
|-id=368 bgcolor=#d6d6d6
| 535368 ||  || — || September 14, 2013 || Haleakala || Pan-STARRS ||  || align=right | 2.2 km || 
|-id=369 bgcolor=#d6d6d6
| 535369 ||  || — || December 21, 2014 || Mount Lemmon || Mount Lemmon Survey ||  || align=right | 2.4 km || 
|-id=370 bgcolor=#d6d6d6
| 535370 ||  || — || February 2, 2005 || Kitt Peak || Spacewatch ||  || align=right | 2.5 km || 
|-id=371 bgcolor=#d6d6d6
| 535371 ||  || — || December 21, 2014 || Mount Lemmon || Mount Lemmon Survey ||  || align=right | 2.8 km || 
|-id=372 bgcolor=#E9E9E9
| 535372 ||  || — || January 8, 2006 || Mount Lemmon || Mount Lemmon Survey ||  || align=right | 2.3 km || 
|-id=373 bgcolor=#d6d6d6
| 535373 ||  || — || July 18, 2013 || Haleakala || Pan-STARRS ||  || align=right | 3.5 km || 
|-id=374 bgcolor=#E9E9E9
| 535374 ||  || — || January 30, 2006 || Kitt Peak || Spacewatch ||  || align=right | 1.9 km || 
|-id=375 bgcolor=#d6d6d6
| 535375 ||  || — || May 7, 2011 || Kitt Peak || Spacewatch ||  || align=right | 2.4 km || 
|-id=376 bgcolor=#fefefe
| 535376 ||  || — || October 4, 2013 || Mount Lemmon || Mount Lemmon Survey ||  || align=right data-sort-value="0.83" | 830 m || 
|-id=377 bgcolor=#E9E9E9
| 535377 ||  || — || May 11, 2007 || Mount Lemmon || Mount Lemmon Survey ||  || align=right | 2.1 km || 
|-id=378 bgcolor=#d6d6d6
| 535378 ||  || — || January 14, 2015 || Haleakala || Pan-STARRS ||  || align=right | 2.9 km || 
|-id=379 bgcolor=#d6d6d6
| 535379 ||  || — || September 6, 2008 || Mount Lemmon || Mount Lemmon Survey ||  || align=right | 2.0 km || 
|-id=380 bgcolor=#E9E9E9
| 535380 ||  || — || October 2, 2013 || Haleakala || Pan-STARRS ||  || align=right | 2.4 km || 
|-id=381 bgcolor=#E9E9E9
| 535381 ||  || — || November 20, 2009 || Kitt Peak || Spacewatch ||  || align=right | 1.5 km || 
|-id=382 bgcolor=#d6d6d6
| 535382 ||  || — || December 21, 2014 || Haleakala || Pan-STARRS ||  || align=right | 3.1 km || 
|-id=383 bgcolor=#d6d6d6
| 535383 ||  || — || February 10, 2010 || Kitt Peak || Spacewatch ||  || align=right | 2.9 km || 
|-id=384 bgcolor=#fefefe
| 535384 ||  || — || October 29, 2003 || Kitt Peak || Spacewatch ||  || align=right data-sort-value="0.50" | 500 m || 
|-id=385 bgcolor=#fefefe
| 535385 ||  || — || December 3, 2010 || Mount Lemmon || Mount Lemmon Survey || MAS || align=right data-sort-value="0.51" | 510 m || 
|-id=386 bgcolor=#E9E9E9
| 535386 ||  || — || December 21, 2014 || Haleakala || Pan-STARRS ||  || align=right data-sort-value="0.98" | 980 m || 
|-id=387 bgcolor=#E9E9E9
| 535387 ||  || — || March 5, 2011 || Catalina || CSS ||  || align=right | 1.8 km || 
|-id=388 bgcolor=#fefefe
| 535388 ||  || — || January 31, 2004 || Kitt Peak || Spacewatch || NYS || align=right data-sort-value="0.44" | 440 m || 
|-id=389 bgcolor=#d6d6d6
| 535389 ||  || — || August 26, 2012 || Haleakala || Pan-STARRS ||  || align=right | 2.5 km || 
|-id=390 bgcolor=#d6d6d6
| 535390 ||  || — || November 2, 2013 || Mount Lemmon || Mount Lemmon Survey ||  || align=right | 2.6 km || 
|-id=391 bgcolor=#E9E9E9
| 535391 ||  || — || August 21, 2008 || Kitt Peak || Spacewatch ||  || align=right | 1.6 km || 
|-id=392 bgcolor=#fefefe
| 535392 ||  || — || January 14, 2015 || Haleakala || Pan-STARRS ||  || align=right data-sort-value="0.50" | 500 m || 
|-id=393 bgcolor=#E9E9E9
| 535393 ||  || — || March 10, 2007 || Mount Lemmon || Mount Lemmon Survey ||  || align=right data-sort-value="0.70" | 700 m || 
|-id=394 bgcolor=#d6d6d6
| 535394 ||  || — || March 27, 2011 || Mount Lemmon || Mount Lemmon Survey ||  || align=right | 2.0 km || 
|-id=395 bgcolor=#fefefe
| 535395 ||  || — || February 8, 2008 || Kitt Peak || Spacewatch ||  || align=right data-sort-value="0.53" | 530 m || 
|-id=396 bgcolor=#fefefe
| 535396 ||  || — || May 4, 2008 || Kitt Peak || Spacewatch ||  || align=right data-sort-value="0.69" | 690 m || 
|-id=397 bgcolor=#fefefe
| 535397 ||  || — || September 18, 2006 || Kitt Peak || Spacewatch || (2076) || align=right data-sort-value="0.75" | 750 m || 
|-id=398 bgcolor=#fefefe
| 535398 ||  || — || June 30, 2013 || Haleakala || Pan-STARRS ||  || align=right data-sort-value="0.63" | 630 m || 
|-id=399 bgcolor=#fefefe
| 535399 ||  || — || August 28, 2009 || La Sagra || OAM Obs. ||  || align=right data-sort-value="0.98" | 980 m || 
|-id=400 bgcolor=#d6d6d6
| 535400 ||  || — || August 10, 2007 || Kitt Peak || Spacewatch ||  || align=right | 3.1 km || 
|}

535401–535500 

|-bgcolor=#fefefe
| 535401 ||  || — || October 3, 2006 || Mount Lemmon || Mount Lemmon Survey || NYS || align=right data-sort-value="0.51" | 510 m || 
|-id=402 bgcolor=#E9E9E9
| 535402 ||  || — || January 27, 2011 || Mount Lemmon || Mount Lemmon Survey ||  || align=right data-sort-value="0.86" | 860 m || 
|-id=403 bgcolor=#d6d6d6
| 535403 ||  || — || August 10, 2007 || Kitt Peak || Spacewatch ||  || align=right | 2.6 km || 
|-id=404 bgcolor=#E9E9E9
| 535404 ||  || — || March 15, 2007 || Kitt Peak || Spacewatch ||  || align=right | 1.3 km || 
|-id=405 bgcolor=#E9E9E9
| 535405 ||  || — || December 21, 2014 || Haleakala || Pan-STARRS ||  || align=right | 1.9 km || 
|-id=406 bgcolor=#E9E9E9
| 535406 ||  || — || March 14, 2007 || Mount Lemmon || Mount Lemmon Survey ||  || align=right | 1.6 km || 
|-id=407 bgcolor=#d6d6d6
| 535407 ||  || — || October 3, 2013 || Mount Lemmon || Mount Lemmon Survey ||  || align=right | 2.4 km || 
|-id=408 bgcolor=#d6d6d6
| 535408 ||  || — || December 18, 2009 || Mount Lemmon || Mount Lemmon Survey ||  || align=right | 2.0 km || 
|-id=409 bgcolor=#E9E9E9
| 535409 ||  || — || January 14, 2011 || Kitt Peak || Spacewatch ||  || align=right | 1.3 km || 
|-id=410 bgcolor=#E9E9E9
| 535410 ||  || — || October 16, 2009 || Mount Lemmon || Mount Lemmon Survey ||  || align=right | 1.3 km || 
|-id=411 bgcolor=#fefefe
| 535411 ||  || — || December 21, 2014 || Haleakala || Pan-STARRS ||  || align=right data-sort-value="0.70" | 700 m || 
|-id=412 bgcolor=#d6d6d6
| 535412 ||  || — || November 21, 2009 || Mount Lemmon || Mount Lemmon Survey ||  || align=right | 3.2 km || 
|-id=413 bgcolor=#E9E9E9
| 535413 ||  || — || August 31, 2014 || Haleakala || Pan-STARRS ||  || align=right data-sort-value="0.77" | 770 m || 
|-id=414 bgcolor=#E9E9E9
| 535414 ||  || — || December 13, 2006 || Kitt Peak || Spacewatch ||  || align=right data-sort-value="0.81" | 810 m || 
|-id=415 bgcolor=#E9E9E9
| 535415 ||  || — || October 22, 2014 || Mount Lemmon || Mount Lemmon Survey ||  || align=right | 1.4 km || 
|-id=416 bgcolor=#E9E9E9
| 535416 ||  || — || November 26, 2014 || Haleakala || Pan-STARRS ||  || align=right | 2.8 km || 
|-id=417 bgcolor=#E9E9E9
| 535417 ||  || — || April 27, 2012 || Haleakala || Pan-STARRS ||  || align=right | 1.1 km || 
|-id=418 bgcolor=#E9E9E9
| 535418 ||  || — || October 29, 2005 || Mount Lemmon || Mount Lemmon Survey ||  || align=right | 2.2 km || 
|-id=419 bgcolor=#E9E9E9
| 535419 ||  || — || December 1, 2005 || Kitt Peak || Spacewatch ||  || align=right | 1.2 km || 
|-id=420 bgcolor=#E9E9E9
| 535420 ||  || — || November 27, 2009 || Mount Lemmon || Mount Lemmon Survey || DOR || align=right | 2.1 km || 
|-id=421 bgcolor=#d6d6d6
| 535421 ||  || — || March 12, 2005 || Kitt Peak || Spacewatch || EOS || align=right | 1.5 km || 
|-id=422 bgcolor=#E9E9E9
| 535422 ||  || — || January 8, 2010 || Mount Lemmon || Mount Lemmon Survey ||  || align=right | 2.2 km || 
|-id=423 bgcolor=#E9E9E9
| 535423 ||  || — || December 2, 2014 || Haleakala || Pan-STARRS ||  || align=right data-sort-value="0.89" | 890 m || 
|-id=424 bgcolor=#d6d6d6
| 535424 ||  || — || November 9, 2013 || Mount Lemmon || Mount Lemmon Survey ||  || align=right | 2.8 km || 
|-id=425 bgcolor=#fefefe
| 535425 ||  || — || November 28, 2010 || Mount Lemmon || Mount Lemmon Survey ||  || align=right data-sort-value="0.75" | 750 m || 
|-id=426 bgcolor=#d6d6d6
| 535426 ||  || — || February 14, 2010 || Mount Lemmon || Mount Lemmon Survey ||  || align=right | 2.3 km || 
|-id=427 bgcolor=#E9E9E9
| 535427 ||  || — || January 16, 2010 || WISE || WISE ||  || align=right | 1.9 km || 
|-id=428 bgcolor=#E9E9E9
| 535428 ||  || — || February 21, 2001 || Kitt Peak || Spacewatch ||  || align=right | 2.0 km || 
|-id=429 bgcolor=#E9E9E9
| 535429 ||  || — || March 4, 2011 || Mount Lemmon || Mount Lemmon Survey ||  || align=right data-sort-value="0.94" | 940 m || 
|-id=430 bgcolor=#E9E9E9
| 535430 ||  || — || November 26, 2014 || Haleakala || Pan-STARRS ||  || align=right | 2.0 km || 
|-id=431 bgcolor=#fefefe
| 535431 ||  || — || January 28, 2011 || Catalina || CSS ||  || align=right data-sort-value="0.81" | 810 m || 
|-id=432 bgcolor=#E9E9E9
| 535432 ||  || — || November 21, 2009 || Mount Lemmon || Mount Lemmon Survey ||  || align=right | 2.0 km || 
|-id=433 bgcolor=#E9E9E9
| 535433 ||  || — || November 12, 2010 || Catalina || CSS ||  || align=right data-sort-value="0.95" | 950 m || 
|-id=434 bgcolor=#C2FFFF
| 535434 ||  || — || October 13, 2001 || Kitt Peak || Spacewatch || L5 || align=right | 8.9 km || 
|-id=435 bgcolor=#E9E9E9
| 535435 ||  || — || November 1, 2005 || Mount Lemmon || Mount Lemmon Survey ||  || align=right | 1.0 km || 
|-id=436 bgcolor=#fefefe
| 535436 ||  || — || September 30, 2006 || Mount Lemmon || Mount Lemmon Survey ||  || align=right data-sort-value="0.64" | 640 m || 
|-id=437 bgcolor=#d6d6d6
| 535437 ||  || — || September 28, 2008 || Mount Lemmon || Mount Lemmon Survey ||  || align=right | 1.8 km || 
|-id=438 bgcolor=#E9E9E9
| 535438 ||  || — || October 22, 2005 || Kitt Peak || Spacewatch ||  || align=right data-sort-value="0.71" | 710 m || 
|-id=439 bgcolor=#E9E9E9
| 535439 ||  || — || April 27, 2012 || Haleakala || Pan-STARRS ||  || align=right data-sort-value="0.99" | 990 m || 
|-id=440 bgcolor=#d6d6d6
| 535440 ||  || — || January 11, 2010 || Kitt Peak || Spacewatch ||  || align=right | 2.9 km || 
|-id=441 bgcolor=#d6d6d6
| 535441 ||  || — || October 9, 2008 || Mount Lemmon || Mount Lemmon Survey || EOS || align=right | 1.7 km || 
|-id=442 bgcolor=#d6d6d6
| 535442 ||  || — || June 9, 2008 || Kitt Peak || Spacewatch ||  || align=right | 2.2 km || 
|-id=443 bgcolor=#E9E9E9
| 535443 ||  || — || January 15, 2015 || Mount Lemmon || Mount Lemmon Survey ||  || align=right | 1.2 km || 
|-id=444 bgcolor=#fefefe
| 535444 ||  || — || April 16, 2004 || Anderson Mesa || LONEOS ||  || align=right data-sort-value="0.85" | 850 m || 
|-id=445 bgcolor=#E9E9E9
| 535445 ||  || — || November 25, 2014 || Haleakala || Pan-STARRS ||  || align=right | 1.3 km || 
|-id=446 bgcolor=#E9E9E9
| 535446 ||  || — || May 3, 2011 || Mount Lemmon || Mount Lemmon Survey || JUN || align=right data-sort-value="0.86" | 860 m || 
|-id=447 bgcolor=#d6d6d6
| 535447 ||  || — || October 14, 2007 || Mount Lemmon || Mount Lemmon Survey ||  || align=right | 3.5 km || 
|-id=448 bgcolor=#E9E9E9
| 535448 ||  || — || April 26, 2006 || Kitt Peak || Spacewatch ||  || align=right | 2.3 km || 
|-id=449 bgcolor=#E9E9E9
| 535449 ||  || — || March 26, 2010 || WISE || WISE || DOR || align=right | 2.3 km || 
|-id=450 bgcolor=#E9E9E9
| 535450 ||  || — || January 30, 2011 || Haleakala || Pan-STARRS ||  || align=right | 1.1 km || 
|-id=451 bgcolor=#fefefe
| 535451 ||  || — || January 11, 2008 || Kitt Peak || Spacewatch ||  || align=right data-sort-value="0.80" | 800 m || 
|-id=452 bgcolor=#E9E9E9
| 535452 ||  || — || March 13, 2007 || Mount Lemmon || Mount Lemmon Survey ||  || align=right | 1.9 km || 
|-id=453 bgcolor=#d6d6d6
| 535453 ||  || — || June 11, 2010 || WISE || WISE || ELF || align=right | 2.9 km || 
|-id=454 bgcolor=#fefefe
| 535454 ||  || — || March 1, 2008 || Kitt Peak || Spacewatch ||  || align=right data-sort-value="0.67" | 670 m || 
|-id=455 bgcolor=#E9E9E9
| 535455 ||  || — || January 14, 2015 || Haleakala || Pan-STARRS ||  || align=right data-sort-value="0.68" | 680 m || 
|-id=456 bgcolor=#E9E9E9
| 535456 ||  || — || October 8, 2005 || Kitt Peak || Spacewatch || (5) || align=right data-sort-value="0.60" | 600 m || 
|-id=457 bgcolor=#fefefe
| 535457 ||  || — || March 12, 2008 || Mount Lemmon || Mount Lemmon Survey ||  || align=right data-sort-value="0.73" | 730 m || 
|-id=458 bgcolor=#E9E9E9
| 535458 ||  || — || August 26, 2013 || Haleakala || Pan-STARRS ||  || align=right data-sort-value="0.91" | 910 m || 
|-id=459 bgcolor=#fefefe
| 535459 ||  || — || March 28, 2008 || Kitt Peak || Spacewatch ||  || align=right data-sort-value="0.60" | 600 m || 
|-id=460 bgcolor=#d6d6d6
| 535460 ||  || — || October 21, 2007 || Kitt Peak || Spacewatch ||  || align=right | 2.4 km || 
|-id=461 bgcolor=#d6d6d6
| 535461 ||  || — || December 31, 2008 || Mount Lemmon || Mount Lemmon Survey ||  || align=right | 3.0 km || 
|-id=462 bgcolor=#d6d6d6
| 535462 ||  || — || November 25, 2013 || Haleakala || Pan-STARRS || EOS || align=right | 1.6 km || 
|-id=463 bgcolor=#E9E9E9
| 535463 ||  || — || August 7, 2013 || Kitt Peak || Spacewatch ||  || align=right | 1.0 km || 
|-id=464 bgcolor=#E9E9E9
| 535464 ||  || — || January 30, 2011 || Haleakala || Pan-STARRS ||  || align=right data-sort-value="0.83" | 830 m || 
|-id=465 bgcolor=#E9E9E9
| 535465 ||  || — || January 15, 2015 || Haleakala || Pan-STARRS ||  || align=right | 1.5 km || 
|-id=466 bgcolor=#C2E0FF
| 535466 ||  || — || February 14, 2011 || Haleakala || Pan-STARRS || other TNOcritical || align=right | 186 km || 
|-id=467 bgcolor=#E9E9E9
| 535467 ||  || — || March 3, 2010 || WISE || WISE ||  || align=right | 2.1 km || 
|-id=468 bgcolor=#E9E9E9
| 535468 ||  || — || September 2, 2008 || La Sagra || OAM Obs. ||  || align=right | 1.8 km || 
|-id=469 bgcolor=#d6d6d6
| 535469 ||  || — || October 10, 2007 || Kitt Peak || Spacewatch ||  || align=right | 5.1 km || 
|-id=470 bgcolor=#E9E9E9
| 535470 ||  || — || September 10, 2013 || Haleakala || Pan-STARRS ||  || align=right | 2.7 km || 
|-id=471 bgcolor=#d6d6d6
| 535471 ||  || — || November 26, 2013 || Haleakala || Pan-STARRS ||  || align=right | 2.8 km || 
|-id=472 bgcolor=#E9E9E9
| 535472 ||  || — || December 26, 2014 || Haleakala || Pan-STARRS ||  || align=right | 1.5 km || 
|-id=473 bgcolor=#E9E9E9
| 535473 ||  || — || January 23, 2006 || Mount Lemmon || Mount Lemmon Survey ||  || align=right | 1.8 km || 
|-id=474 bgcolor=#fefefe
| 535474 ||  || — || March 28, 2012 || Mount Lemmon || Mount Lemmon Survey ||  || align=right data-sort-value="0.81" | 810 m || 
|-id=475 bgcolor=#d6d6d6
| 535475 ||  || — || October 16, 2007 || Mount Lemmon || Mount Lemmon Survey ||  || align=right | 4.5 km || 
|-id=476 bgcolor=#d6d6d6
| 535476 ||  || — || December 3, 2013 || Haleakala || Pan-STARRS ||  || align=right | 3.2 km || 
|-id=477 bgcolor=#E9E9E9
| 535477 ||  || — || January 15, 2015 || Haleakala || Pan-STARRS ||  || align=right | 1.1 km || 
|-id=478 bgcolor=#d6d6d6
| 535478 ||  || — || March 11, 2005 || Catalina || CSS ||  || align=right | 3.5 km || 
|-id=479 bgcolor=#fefefe
| 535479 ||  || — || January 13, 2015 || Haleakala || Pan-STARRS ||  || align=right | 1.0 km || 
|-id=480 bgcolor=#fefefe
| 535480 ||  || — || March 6, 2008 || Mount Lemmon || Mount Lemmon Survey ||  || align=right data-sort-value="0.76" | 760 m || 
|-id=481 bgcolor=#fefefe
| 535481 ||  || — || September 12, 2013 || Catalina || CSS ||  || align=right data-sort-value="0.98" | 980 m || 
|-id=482 bgcolor=#d6d6d6
| 535482 ||  || — || January 15, 2015 || Haleakala || Pan-STARRS ||  || align=right | 2.6 km || 
|-id=483 bgcolor=#E9E9E9
| 535483 ||  || — || January 15, 2015 || Haleakala || Pan-STARRS ||  || align=right | 1.0 km || 
|-id=484 bgcolor=#E9E9E9
| 535484 ||  || — || January 19, 2002 || Anderson Mesa || LONEOS ||  || align=right | 2.6 km || 
|-id=485 bgcolor=#fefefe
| 535485 ||  || — || January 11, 2008 || Mount Lemmon || Mount Lemmon Survey ||  || align=right data-sort-value="0.94" | 940 m || 
|-id=486 bgcolor=#fefefe
| 535486 ||  || — || June 12, 2005 || Kitt Peak || Spacewatch ||  || align=right data-sort-value="0.92" | 920 m || 
|-id=487 bgcolor=#d6d6d6
| 535487 ||  || — || January 15, 2015 || Haleakala || Pan-STARRS ||  || align=right | 2.3 km || 
|-id=488 bgcolor=#E9E9E9
| 535488 ||  || — || September 20, 2009 || Kitt Peak || Spacewatch ||  || align=right | 1.1 km || 
|-id=489 bgcolor=#E9E9E9
| 535489 ||  || — || October 8, 2008 || Mount Lemmon || Mount Lemmon Survey ||  || align=right | 1.6 km || 
|-id=490 bgcolor=#d6d6d6
| 535490 ||  || — || March 18, 2010 || Kitt Peak || Spacewatch ||  || align=right | 2.9 km || 
|-id=491 bgcolor=#E9E9E9
| 535491 ||  || — || October 3, 2013 || Haleakala || Pan-STARRS ||  || align=right | 2.1 km || 
|-id=492 bgcolor=#E9E9E9
| 535492 ||  || — || November 18, 2006 || Kitt Peak || Spacewatch ||  || align=right | 1.3 km || 
|-id=493 bgcolor=#E9E9E9
| 535493 ||  || — || January 9, 2015 || Haleakala || Pan-STARRS ||  || align=right | 1.1 km || 
|-id=494 bgcolor=#E9E9E9
| 535494 ||  || — || July 2, 2013 || Haleakala || Pan-STARRS ||  || align=right | 1.3 km || 
|-id=495 bgcolor=#E9E9E9
| 535495 ||  || — || February 10, 2002 || Socorro || LINEAR ||  || align=right | 2.4 km || 
|-id=496 bgcolor=#fefefe
| 535496 ||  || — || November 18, 1995 || Kitt Peak || Spacewatch ||  || align=right data-sort-value="0.74" | 740 m || 
|-id=497 bgcolor=#E9E9E9
| 535497 ||  || — || November 22, 2009 || Catalina || CSS ||  || align=right | 2.1 km || 
|-id=498 bgcolor=#d6d6d6
| 535498 ||  || — || April 12, 2011 || Mount Lemmon || Mount Lemmon Survey ||  || align=right | 3.2 km || 
|-id=499 bgcolor=#E9E9E9
| 535499 ||  || — || September 20, 2001 || Socorro || LINEAR ||  || align=right data-sort-value="0.98" | 980 m || 
|-id=500 bgcolor=#E9E9E9
| 535500 ||  || — || November 11, 2004 || Kitt Peak || Spacewatch ||  || align=right | 3.1 km || 
|}

535501–535600 

|-bgcolor=#fefefe
| 535501 ||  || — || January 16, 2008 || Mount Lemmon || Mount Lemmon Survey ||  || align=right data-sort-value="0.59" | 590 m || 
|-id=502 bgcolor=#E9E9E9
| 535502 ||  || — || January 15, 2015 || Haleakala || Pan-STARRS ||  || align=right | 2.2 km || 
|-id=503 bgcolor=#E9E9E9
| 535503 ||  || — || December 11, 2009 || Mount Lemmon || Mount Lemmon Survey ||  || align=right | 2.1 km || 
|-id=504 bgcolor=#E9E9E9
| 535504 ||  || — || August 23, 2004 || Kitt Peak || Spacewatch ||  || align=right | 1.9 km || 
|-id=505 bgcolor=#d6d6d6
| 535505 ||  || — || February 9, 2010 || Kitt Peak || Spacewatch ||  || align=right | 2.7 km || 
|-id=506 bgcolor=#d6d6d6
| 535506 ||  || — || June 14, 2010 || WISE || WISE ||  || align=right | 3.3 km || 
|-id=507 bgcolor=#E9E9E9
| 535507 ||  || — || September 10, 2013 || Haleakala || Pan-STARRS ||  || align=right | 2.2 km || 
|-id=508 bgcolor=#E9E9E9
| 535508 ||  || — || March 11, 2007 || Kitt Peak || Spacewatch ||  || align=right data-sort-value="0.85" | 850 m || 
|-id=509 bgcolor=#E9E9E9
| 535509 ||  || — || October 27, 2005 || Mount Lemmon || Mount Lemmon Survey ||  || align=right | 2.5 km || 
|-id=510 bgcolor=#E9E9E9
| 535510 ||  || — || March 12, 2011 || Mount Lemmon || Mount Lemmon Survey ||  || align=right | 2.0 km || 
|-id=511 bgcolor=#fefefe
| 535511 ||  || — || November 27, 2010 || Mount Lemmon || Mount Lemmon Survey ||  || align=right data-sort-value="0.80" | 800 m || 
|-id=512 bgcolor=#fefefe
| 535512 ||  || — || March 2, 2008 || Kitt Peak || Spacewatch ||  || align=right data-sort-value="0.88" | 880 m || 
|-id=513 bgcolor=#fefefe
| 535513 ||  || — || May 4, 2005 || Mount Lemmon || Mount Lemmon Survey ||  || align=right data-sort-value="0.56" | 560 m || 
|-id=514 bgcolor=#E9E9E9
| 535514 ||  || — || August 31, 2005 || Kitt Peak || Spacewatch ||  || align=right | 1.2 km || 
|-id=515 bgcolor=#E9E9E9
| 535515 ||  || — || February 1, 2006 || Mount Lemmon || Mount Lemmon Survey ||  || align=right | 1.7 km || 
|-id=516 bgcolor=#E9E9E9
| 535516 ||  || — || January 31, 2006 || Kitt Peak || Spacewatch ||  || align=right | 1.7 km || 
|-id=517 bgcolor=#d6d6d6
| 535517 ||  || — || October 5, 2013 || Kitt Peak || Spacewatch ||  || align=right | 2.9 km || 
|-id=518 bgcolor=#d6d6d6
| 535518 ||  || — || January 16, 2015 || Mount Lemmon || Mount Lemmon Survey ||  || align=right | 2.7 km || 
|-id=519 bgcolor=#E9E9E9
| 535519 ||  || — || March 29, 2011 || Catalina || CSS ||  || align=right data-sort-value="0.84" | 840 m || 
|-id=520 bgcolor=#fefefe
| 535520 ||  || — || November 26, 2014 || Haleakala || Pan-STARRS ||  || align=right data-sort-value="0.85" | 850 m || 
|-id=521 bgcolor=#E9E9E9
| 535521 ||  || — || January 23, 2006 || Kitt Peak || Spacewatch ||  || align=right | 1.8 km || 
|-id=522 bgcolor=#E9E9E9
| 535522 ||  || — || October 24, 2005 || Kitt Peak || Spacewatch ||  || align=right data-sort-value="0.88" | 880 m || 
|-id=523 bgcolor=#E9E9E9
| 535523 ||  || — || March 3, 2006 || Kitt Peak || Spacewatch ||  || align=right | 1.7 km || 
|-id=524 bgcolor=#d6d6d6
| 535524 ||  || — || January 16, 2015 || Haleakala || Pan-STARRS ||  || align=right | 2.5 km || 
|-id=525 bgcolor=#d6d6d6
| 535525 ||  || — || May 16, 2005 || Mount Lemmon || Mount Lemmon Survey ||  || align=right | 3.1 km || 
|-id=526 bgcolor=#d6d6d6
| 535526 ||  || — || December 1, 2008 || Kitt Peak || Spacewatch ||  || align=right | 2.6 km || 
|-id=527 bgcolor=#d6d6d6
| 535527 ||  || — || July 28, 2011 || Haleakala || Pan-STARRS ||  || align=right | 2.9 km || 
|-id=528 bgcolor=#d6d6d6
| 535528 ||  || — || January 11, 2010 || Kitt Peak || Spacewatch ||  || align=right | 2.2 km || 
|-id=529 bgcolor=#d6d6d6
| 535529 ||  || — || November 11, 2013 || Mount Lemmon || Mount Lemmon Survey ||  || align=right | 2.6 km || 
|-id=530 bgcolor=#fefefe
| 535530 ||  || — || January 16, 2015 || Haleakala || Pan-STARRS ||  || align=right data-sort-value="0.67" | 670 m || 
|-id=531 bgcolor=#E9E9E9
| 535531 ||  || — || March 10, 2007 || Kitt Peak || Spacewatch ||  || align=right data-sort-value="0.68" | 680 m || 
|-id=532 bgcolor=#E9E9E9
| 535532 ||  || — || March 4, 2011 || Mount Lemmon || Mount Lemmon Survey ||  || align=right data-sort-value="0.65" | 650 m || 
|-id=533 bgcolor=#d6d6d6
| 535533 ||  || — || January 29, 2009 || Mount Lemmon || Mount Lemmon Survey ||  || align=right | 3.3 km || 
|-id=534 bgcolor=#d6d6d6
| 535534 ||  || — || September 11, 2007 || Catalina || CSS ||  || align=right | 3.6 km || 
|-id=535 bgcolor=#d6d6d6
| 535535 ||  || — || October 9, 2007 || Mount Lemmon || Mount Lemmon Survey ||  || align=right | 3.2 km || 
|-id=536 bgcolor=#d6d6d6
| 535536 ||  || — || December 21, 2008 || Kitt Peak || Spacewatch ||  || align=right | 3.1 km || 
|-id=537 bgcolor=#d6d6d6
| 535537 ||  || — || July 13, 2013 || Haleakala || Pan-STARRS ||  || align=right | 2.7 km || 
|-id=538 bgcolor=#d6d6d6
| 535538 ||  || — || May 2, 2006 || Mount Lemmon || Mount Lemmon Survey ||  || align=right | 1.8 km || 
|-id=539 bgcolor=#d6d6d6
| 535539 ||  || — || December 27, 2009 || Kitt Peak || Spacewatch ||  || align=right | 2.2 km || 
|-id=540 bgcolor=#E9E9E9
| 535540 ||  || — || November 16, 2009 || Mount Lemmon || Mount Lemmon Survey ||  || align=right | 1.5 km || 
|-id=541 bgcolor=#E9E9E9
| 535541 ||  || — || December 7, 2005 || Kitt Peak || Spacewatch ||  || align=right data-sort-value="0.79" | 790 m || 
|-id=542 bgcolor=#E9E9E9
| 535542 ||  || — || January 16, 2015 || Haleakala || Pan-STARRS ||  || align=right | 1.1 km || 
|-id=543 bgcolor=#E9E9E9
| 535543 ||  || — || November 20, 2009 || Mount Lemmon || Mount Lemmon Survey ||  || align=right | 2.0 km || 
|-id=544 bgcolor=#d6d6d6
| 535544 ||  || — || January 16, 2015 || Haleakala || Pan-STARRS ||  || align=right | 3.0 km || 
|-id=545 bgcolor=#fefefe
| 535545 ||  || — || November 9, 2013 || Mount Lemmon || Mount Lemmon Survey ||  || align=right data-sort-value="0.78" | 780 m || 
|-id=546 bgcolor=#E9E9E9
| 535546 ||  || — || January 7, 2010 || Kitt Peak || Spacewatch ||  || align=right | 2.5 km || 
|-id=547 bgcolor=#E9E9E9
| 535547 ||  || — || February 24, 2006 || Catalina || CSS ||  || align=right | 1.8 km || 
|-id=548 bgcolor=#E9E9E9
| 535548 ||  || — || December 1, 2005 || Catalina || CSS ||  || align=right | 1.2 km || 
|-id=549 bgcolor=#E9E9E9
| 535549 ||  || — || October 21, 1995 || Kitt Peak || Spacewatch ||  || align=right | 1.7 km || 
|-id=550 bgcolor=#E9E9E9
| 535550 ||  || — || October 28, 2014 || Haleakala || Pan-STARRS ||  || align=right | 1.0 km || 
|-id=551 bgcolor=#E9E9E9
| 535551 ||  || — || October 26, 2009 || Mount Lemmon || Mount Lemmon Survey ||  || align=right | 2.0 km || 
|-id=552 bgcolor=#E9E9E9
| 535552 ||  || — || July 27, 2005 || Siding Spring || SSS ||  || align=right | 1.1 km || 
|-id=553 bgcolor=#d6d6d6
| 535553 ||  || — || January 17, 2015 || Kitt Peak || Spacewatch ||  || align=right | 2.4 km || 
|-id=554 bgcolor=#E9E9E9
| 535554 ||  || — || January 17, 2015 || Mount Lemmon || Mount Lemmon Survey ||  || align=right | 2.0 km || 
|-id=555 bgcolor=#E9E9E9
| 535555 ||  || — || November 3, 2005 || Mount Lemmon || Mount Lemmon Survey ||  || align=right | 1.1 km || 
|-id=556 bgcolor=#d6d6d6
| 535556 ||  || — || February 5, 2010 || Kitt Peak || Spacewatch ||  || align=right | 3.0 km || 
|-id=557 bgcolor=#E9E9E9
| 535557 ||  || — || November 20, 2001 || Socorro || LINEAR ||  || align=right | 1.2 km || 
|-id=558 bgcolor=#E9E9E9
| 535558 ||  || — || October 4, 2013 || Mount Lemmon || Mount Lemmon Survey ||  || align=right | 1.7 km || 
|-id=559 bgcolor=#E9E9E9
| 535559 ||  || — || March 31, 2011 || Haleakala || Pan-STARRS ||  || align=right | 2.5 km || 
|-id=560 bgcolor=#fefefe
| 535560 ||  || — || November 16, 2014 || Mount Lemmon || Mount Lemmon Survey ||  || align=right data-sort-value="0.95" | 950 m || 
|-id=561 bgcolor=#d6d6d6
| 535561 ||  || — || September 3, 2008 || Kitt Peak || Spacewatch ||  || align=right | 2.0 km || 
|-id=562 bgcolor=#d6d6d6
| 535562 ||  || — || November 20, 2008 || Kitt Peak || Spacewatch ||  || align=right | 2.9 km || 
|-id=563 bgcolor=#E9E9E9
| 535563 ||  || — || November 9, 2009 || Mount Lemmon || Mount Lemmon Survey ||  || align=right | 1.9 km || 
|-id=564 bgcolor=#E9E9E9
| 535564 ||  || — || November 4, 2014 || Haleakala || Pan-STARRS ||  || align=right | 1.6 km || 
|-id=565 bgcolor=#E9E9E9
| 535565 ||  || — || January 27, 2006 || Kitt Peak || Spacewatch ||  || align=right | 1.7 km || 
|-id=566 bgcolor=#E9E9E9
| 535566 ||  || — || January 30, 2011 || Haleakala || Pan-STARRS ||  || align=right data-sort-value="0.65" | 650 m || 
|-id=567 bgcolor=#fefefe
| 535567 ||  || — || September 1, 2013 || Haleakala || Pan-STARRS ||  || align=right data-sort-value="0.67" | 670 m || 
|-id=568 bgcolor=#fefefe
| 535568 ||  || — || November 24, 2006 || Kitt Peak || Spacewatch ||  || align=right data-sort-value="0.69" | 690 m || 
|-id=569 bgcolor=#E9E9E9
| 535569 ||  || — || November 26, 2014 || Haleakala || Pan-STARRS ||  || align=right | 1.4 km || 
|-id=570 bgcolor=#fefefe
| 535570 ||  || — || November 16, 2006 || Kitt Peak || Spacewatch ||  || align=right data-sort-value="0.55" | 550 m || 
|-id=571 bgcolor=#d6d6d6
| 535571 ||  || — || January 17, 2015 || Haleakala || Pan-STARRS ||  || align=right | 2.2 km || 
|-id=572 bgcolor=#d6d6d6
| 535572 ||  || — || October 23, 2013 || Haleakala || Pan-STARRS ||  || align=right | 3.0 km || 
|-id=573 bgcolor=#d6d6d6
| 535573 ||  || — || September 12, 2013 || Mount Lemmon || Mount Lemmon Survey ||  || align=right | 2.6 km || 
|-id=574 bgcolor=#d6d6d6
| 535574 ||  || — || November 1, 2013 || Mount Lemmon || Mount Lemmon Survey ||  || align=right | 2.0 km || 
|-id=575 bgcolor=#d6d6d6
| 535575 ||  || — || November 9, 2008 || Mount Lemmon || Mount Lemmon Survey ||  || align=right | 2.4 km || 
|-id=576 bgcolor=#d6d6d6
| 535576 ||  || — || October 25, 2008 || Kitt Peak || Spacewatch ||  || align=right | 3.0 km || 
|-id=577 bgcolor=#d6d6d6
| 535577 ||  || — || May 11, 2010 || WISE || WISE ||  || align=right | 3.3 km || 
|-id=578 bgcolor=#E9E9E9
| 535578 ||  || — || March 30, 2011 || Mount Lemmon || Mount Lemmon Survey ||  || align=right | 1.9 km || 
|-id=579 bgcolor=#E9E9E9
| 535579 ||  || — || November 18, 2001 || Socorro || LINEAR ||  || align=right | 1.1 km || 
|-id=580 bgcolor=#E9E9E9
| 535580 ||  || — || February 13, 2011 || Mount Lemmon || Mount Lemmon Survey ||  || align=right data-sort-value="0.92" | 920 m || 
|-id=581 bgcolor=#fefefe
| 535581 ||  || — || December 24, 2006 || Kitt Peak || Spacewatch ||  || align=right data-sort-value="0.55" | 550 m || 
|-id=582 bgcolor=#fefefe
| 535582 ||  || — || November 10, 2006 || Kitt Peak || Spacewatch ||  || align=right data-sort-value="0.60" | 600 m || 
|-id=583 bgcolor=#d6d6d6
| 535583 ||  || — || September 29, 2009 || Mount Lemmon || Mount Lemmon Survey ||  || align=right | 2.7 km || 
|-id=584 bgcolor=#E9E9E9
| 535584 ||  || — || October 18, 2009 || Mount Lemmon || Mount Lemmon Survey ||  || align=right data-sort-value="0.90" | 900 m || 
|-id=585 bgcolor=#E9E9E9
| 535585 ||  || — || February 24, 2006 || Mount Lemmon || Mount Lemmon Survey ||  || align=right | 1.8 km || 
|-id=586 bgcolor=#E9E9E9
| 535586 ||  || — || August 9, 2013 || Kitt Peak || Spacewatch ||  || align=right | 1.6 km || 
|-id=587 bgcolor=#d6d6d6
| 535587 ||  || — || May 9, 2011 || Mount Lemmon || Mount Lemmon Survey ||  || align=right | 3.0 km || 
|-id=588 bgcolor=#fefefe
| 535588 ||  || — || May 27, 2008 || Kitt Peak || Spacewatch ||  || align=right data-sort-value="0.77" | 770 m || 
|-id=589 bgcolor=#fefefe
| 535589 ||  || — || February 26, 2008 || Mount Lemmon || Mount Lemmon Survey ||  || align=right data-sort-value="0.67" | 670 m || 
|-id=590 bgcolor=#E9E9E9
| 535590 ||  || — || January 30, 2011 || Haleakala || Pan-STARRS ||  || align=right data-sort-value="0.96" | 960 m || 
|-id=591 bgcolor=#E9E9E9
| 535591 ||  || — || January 17, 2010 || WISE || WISE ||  || align=right | 2.8 km || 
|-id=592 bgcolor=#E9E9E9
| 535592 ||  || — || January 27, 2007 || Mount Lemmon || Mount Lemmon Survey ||  || align=right data-sort-value="0.71" | 710 m || 
|-id=593 bgcolor=#E9E9E9
| 535593 ||  || — || December 30, 2005 || Kitt Peak || Spacewatch ||  || align=right | 1.7 km || 
|-id=594 bgcolor=#fefefe
| 535594 ||  || — || October 7, 2010 || Catalina || CSS ||  || align=right data-sort-value="0.85" | 850 m || 
|-id=595 bgcolor=#fefefe
| 535595 ||  || — || November 27, 2010 || Mount Lemmon || Mount Lemmon Survey ||  || align=right data-sort-value="0.72" | 720 m || 
|-id=596 bgcolor=#fefefe
| 535596 ||  || — || January 17, 2015 || Haleakala || Pan-STARRS ||  || align=right data-sort-value="0.73" | 730 m || 
|-id=597 bgcolor=#E9E9E9
| 535597 ||  || — || April 2, 2011 || Kitt Peak || Spacewatch ||  || align=right | 2.2 km || 
|-id=598 bgcolor=#E9E9E9
| 535598 ||  || — || April 4, 2010 || WISE || WISE ||  || align=right | 2.7 km || 
|-id=599 bgcolor=#d6d6d6
| 535599 ||  || — || November 26, 2014 || Haleakala || Pan-STARRS ||  || align=right | 2.8 km || 
|-id=600 bgcolor=#E9E9E9
| 535600 ||  || — || April 11, 2007 || Mount Lemmon || Mount Lemmon Survey ||  || align=right | 1.4 km || 
|}

535601–535700 

|-bgcolor=#d6d6d6
| 535601 ||  || — || April 25, 2007 || Kitt Peak || Spacewatch ||  || align=right | 3.4 km || 
|-id=602 bgcolor=#fefefe
| 535602 ||  || — || September 12, 2013 || Kitt Peak || Spacewatch ||  || align=right data-sort-value="0.91" | 910 m || 
|-id=603 bgcolor=#E9E9E9
| 535603 ||  || — || September 14, 2005 || Kitt Peak || Spacewatch ||  || align=right | 1.0 km || 
|-id=604 bgcolor=#E9E9E9
| 535604 ||  || — || January 30, 2011 || Haleakala || Pan-STARRS ||  || align=right data-sort-value="0.77" | 770 m || 
|-id=605 bgcolor=#E9E9E9
| 535605 ||  || — || December 5, 2010 || Mount Lemmon || Mount Lemmon Survey ||  || align=right data-sort-value="0.92" | 920 m || 
|-id=606 bgcolor=#d6d6d6
| 535606 ||  || — || November 18, 2008 || Kitt Peak || Spacewatch ||  || align=right | 2.6 km || 
|-id=607 bgcolor=#fefefe
| 535607 ||  || — || April 3, 2008 || Kitt Peak || Spacewatch ||  || align=right data-sort-value="0.82" | 820 m || 
|-id=608 bgcolor=#E9E9E9
| 535608 ||  || — || September 14, 2013 || Haleakala || Pan-STARRS ||  || align=right | 1.9 km || 
|-id=609 bgcolor=#d6d6d6
| 535609 ||  || — || September 24, 2012 || Mount Lemmon || Mount Lemmon Survey ||  || align=right | 3.3 km || 
|-id=610 bgcolor=#E9E9E9
| 535610 ||  || — || February 10, 2010 || WISE || WISE ||  || align=right | 1.7 km || 
|-id=611 bgcolor=#fefefe
| 535611 ||  || — || November 20, 2006 || Kitt Peak || Spacewatch ||  || align=right data-sort-value="0.66" | 660 m || 
|-id=612 bgcolor=#fefefe
| 535612 ||  || — || October 2, 2006 || Mount Lemmon || Mount Lemmon Survey ||  || align=right data-sort-value="0.73" | 730 m || 
|-id=613 bgcolor=#d6d6d6
| 535613 ||  || — || December 18, 2009 || Kitt Peak || Spacewatch ||  || align=right | 2.5 km || 
|-id=614 bgcolor=#d6d6d6
| 535614 ||  || — || December 18, 2004 || Mount Lemmon || Mount Lemmon Survey ||  || align=right | 2.5 km || 
|-id=615 bgcolor=#E9E9E9
| 535615 ||  || — || November 16, 2009 || Mount Lemmon || Mount Lemmon Survey ||  || align=right | 1.3 km || 
|-id=616 bgcolor=#d6d6d6
| 535616 ||  || — || November 27, 2013 || Haleakala || Pan-STARRS ||  || align=right | 2.9 km || 
|-id=617 bgcolor=#E9E9E9
| 535617 ||  || — || February 11, 2002 || Kitt Peak || Spacewatch ||  || align=right | 1.5 km || 
|-id=618 bgcolor=#E9E9E9
| 535618 ||  || — || January 18, 2015 || Haleakala || Pan-STARRS ||  || align=right | 1.1 km || 
|-id=619 bgcolor=#d6d6d6
| 535619 ||  || — || January 18, 2015 || Haleakala || Pan-STARRS ||  || align=right | 2.5 km || 
|-id=620 bgcolor=#E9E9E9
| 535620 ||  || — || March 5, 2011 || Mount Lemmon || Mount Lemmon Survey ||  || align=right data-sort-value="0.75" | 750 m || 
|-id=621 bgcolor=#E9E9E9
| 535621 ||  || — || November 25, 2009 || Kitt Peak || Spacewatch ||  || align=right | 2.6 km || 
|-id=622 bgcolor=#E9E9E9
| 535622 ||  || — || May 29, 2012 || Mount Lemmon || Mount Lemmon Survey ||  || align=right | 1.9 km || 
|-id=623 bgcolor=#E9E9E9
| 535623 ||  || — || January 28, 2011 || Mount Lemmon || Mount Lemmon Survey ||  || align=right | 1.3 km || 
|-id=624 bgcolor=#E9E9E9
| 535624 ||  || — || November 17, 2009 || Kitt Peak || Spacewatch ||  || align=right | 1.7 km || 
|-id=625 bgcolor=#d6d6d6
| 535625 ||  || — || October 3, 2008 || Mount Lemmon || Mount Lemmon Survey ||  || align=right | 2.9 km || 
|-id=626 bgcolor=#fefefe
| 535626 ||  || — || January 14, 2011 || Mount Lemmon || Mount Lemmon Survey ||  || align=right data-sort-value="0.69" | 690 m || 
|-id=627 bgcolor=#E9E9E9
| 535627 ||  || — || November 19, 2009 || Kitt Peak || Spacewatch ||  || align=right | 1.6 km || 
|-id=628 bgcolor=#d6d6d6
| 535628 ||  || — || May 27, 2006 || Kitt Peak || Spacewatch || EMA || align=right | 3.2 km || 
|-id=629 bgcolor=#d6d6d6
| 535629 ||  || — || January 15, 2009 || Kitt Peak || Spacewatch ||  || align=right | 2.9 km || 
|-id=630 bgcolor=#fefefe
| 535630 ||  || — || March 21, 2004 || Kitt Peak || Spacewatch ||  || align=right data-sort-value="0.66" | 660 m || 
|-id=631 bgcolor=#fefefe
| 535631 ||  || — || November 3, 2010 || Mount Lemmon || Mount Lemmon Survey ||  || align=right data-sort-value="0.65" | 650 m || 
|-id=632 bgcolor=#fefefe
| 535632 ||  || — || September 14, 2006 || Kitt Peak || Spacewatch ||  || align=right data-sort-value="0.58" | 580 m || 
|-id=633 bgcolor=#E9E9E9
| 535633 ||  || — || January 21, 2006 || Kitt Peak || Spacewatch ||  || align=right | 1.6 km || 
|-id=634 bgcolor=#d6d6d6
| 535634 ||  || — || December 17, 2009 || Kitt Peak || Spacewatch ||  || align=right | 2.4 km || 
|-id=635 bgcolor=#d6d6d6
| 535635 ||  || — || January 7, 2000 || Kitt Peak || Spacewatch ||  || align=right | 2.7 km || 
|-id=636 bgcolor=#E9E9E9
| 535636 ||  || — || September 14, 2012 || La Sagra || OAM Obs. ||  || align=right | 2.2 km || 
|-id=637 bgcolor=#E9E9E9
| 535637 ||  || — || December 15, 2004 || Kitt Peak || Spacewatch ||  || align=right | 2.6 km || 
|-id=638 bgcolor=#fefefe
| 535638 ||  || — || November 4, 2010 || Mount Lemmon || Mount Lemmon Survey ||  || align=right data-sort-value="0.52" | 520 m || 
|-id=639 bgcolor=#d6d6d6
| 535639 ||  || — || April 7, 2010 || WISE || WISE ||  || align=right | 4.3 km || 
|-id=640 bgcolor=#d6d6d6
| 535640 ||  || — || April 6, 2010 || WISE || WISE || NAE || align=right | 2.5 km || 
|-id=641 bgcolor=#E9E9E9
| 535641 ||  || — || October 9, 2004 || Kitt Peak || Spacewatch ||  || align=right | 1.8 km || 
|-id=642 bgcolor=#E9E9E9
| 535642 ||  || — || March 13, 2007 || Mount Lemmon || Mount Lemmon Survey ||  || align=right | 2.2 km || 
|-id=643 bgcolor=#E9E9E9
| 535643 ||  || — || July 15, 2013 || Haleakala || Pan-STARRS ||  || align=right | 1.7 km || 
|-id=644 bgcolor=#d6d6d6
| 535644 ||  || — || October 31, 2008 || Kitt Peak || Spacewatch ||  || align=right | 2.9 km || 
|-id=645 bgcolor=#d6d6d6
| 535645 ||  || — || May 21, 2011 || Haleakala || Pan-STARRS ||  || align=right | 4.4 km || 
|-id=646 bgcolor=#E9E9E9
| 535646 ||  || — || December 5, 2010 || Mount Lemmon || Mount Lemmon Survey ||  || align=right data-sort-value="0.68" | 680 m || 
|-id=647 bgcolor=#d6d6d6
| 535647 ||  || — || November 26, 2014 || Mount Lemmon || Mount Lemmon Survey || BRA || align=right | 1.7 km || 
|-id=648 bgcolor=#E9E9E9
| 535648 ||  || — || January 17, 2015 || Kitt Peak || Spacewatch ||  || align=right | 1.8 km || 
|-id=649 bgcolor=#fefefe
| 535649 ||  || — || April 6, 2008 || Kitt Peak || Spacewatch ||  || align=right data-sort-value="0.81" | 810 m || 
|-id=650 bgcolor=#E9E9E9
| 535650 ||  || — || March 19, 2010 || WISE || WISE || DOR || align=right | 2.1 km || 
|-id=651 bgcolor=#E9E9E9
| 535651 ||  || — || December 27, 2006 || Mount Lemmon || Mount Lemmon Survey ||  || align=right | 1.1 km || 
|-id=652 bgcolor=#fefefe
| 535652 ||  || — || May 1, 2009 || Kitt Peak || Spacewatch ||  || align=right data-sort-value="0.56" | 560 m || 
|-id=653 bgcolor=#E9E9E9
| 535653 ||  || — || October 24, 2005 || Kitt Peak || Spacewatch ||  || align=right | 1.1 km || 
|-id=654 bgcolor=#d6d6d6
| 535654 ||  || — || September 5, 2013 || Kitt Peak || Spacewatch ||  || align=right | 1.9 km || 
|-id=655 bgcolor=#d6d6d6
| 535655 ||  || — || August 17, 2012 || Haleakala || Pan-STARRS ||  || align=right | 3.1 km || 
|-id=656 bgcolor=#fefefe
| 535656 ||  || — || March 15, 2012 || Haleakala || Pan-STARRS ||  || align=right data-sort-value="0.73" | 730 m || 
|-id=657 bgcolor=#E9E9E9
| 535657 ||  || — || January 23, 2006 || Mount Lemmon || Mount Lemmon Survey ||  || align=right | 1.9 km || 
|-id=658 bgcolor=#fefefe
| 535658 ||  || — || January 16, 2015 || Mount Lemmon || Mount Lemmon Survey ||  || align=right data-sort-value="0.63" | 630 m || 
|-id=659 bgcolor=#fefefe
| 535659 ||  || — || March 6, 2008 || Mount Lemmon || Mount Lemmon Survey ||  || align=right data-sort-value="0.83" | 830 m || 
|-id=660 bgcolor=#E9E9E9
| 535660 ||  || — || March 12, 2007 || Kitt Peak || Spacewatch ||  || align=right data-sort-value="0.66" | 660 m || 
|-id=661 bgcolor=#E9E9E9
| 535661 ||  || — || November 27, 2009 || Kitt Peak || Spacewatch ||  || align=right | 1.9 km || 
|-id=662 bgcolor=#d6d6d6
| 535662 ||  || — || April 26, 2011 || Kitt Peak || Spacewatch ||  || align=right | 3.4 km || 
|-id=663 bgcolor=#E9E9E9
| 535663 ||  || — || September 25, 2005 || Kitt Peak || Spacewatch ||  || align=right | 1.3 km || 
|-id=664 bgcolor=#E9E9E9
| 535664 ||  || — || September 1, 2005 || Kitt Peak || Spacewatch || (5) || align=right data-sort-value="0.52" | 520 m || 
|-id=665 bgcolor=#fefefe
| 535665 ||  || — || January 4, 2011 || Mount Lemmon || Mount Lemmon Survey || NYS || align=right data-sort-value="0.57" | 570 m || 
|-id=666 bgcolor=#d6d6d6
| 535666 ||  || — || February 13, 2010 || Kitt Peak || Spacewatch ||  || align=right | 3.3 km || 
|-id=667 bgcolor=#fefefe
| 535667 ||  || — || January 17, 2015 || Haleakala || Pan-STARRS ||  || align=right data-sort-value="0.74" | 740 m || 
|-id=668 bgcolor=#fefefe
| 535668 ||  || — || August 14, 2013 || Haleakala || Pan-STARRS || V || align=right data-sort-value="0.61" | 610 m || 
|-id=669 bgcolor=#E9E9E9
| 535669 ||  || — || January 17, 2015 || Haleakala || Pan-STARRS ||  || align=right | 2.5 km || 
|-id=670 bgcolor=#fefefe
| 535670 ||  || — || October 29, 2010 || Kitt Peak || Spacewatch ||  || align=right data-sort-value="0.66" | 660 m || 
|-id=671 bgcolor=#E9E9E9
| 535671 ||  || — || January 17, 2015 || Haleakala || Pan-STARRS ||  || align=right | 3.5 km || 
|-id=672 bgcolor=#d6d6d6
| 535672 ||  || — || May 25, 2006 || Kitt Peak || Spacewatch ||  || align=right | 2.7 km || 
|-id=673 bgcolor=#E9E9E9
| 535673 ||  || — || January 17, 2015 || Haleakala || Pan-STARRS ||  || align=right | 1.5 km || 
|-id=674 bgcolor=#fefefe
| 535674 ||  || — || March 12, 2008 || Kitt Peak || Spacewatch ||  || align=right data-sort-value="0.88" | 880 m || 
|-id=675 bgcolor=#E9E9E9
| 535675 ||  || — || October 7, 2004 || Kitt Peak || Spacewatch || MRX || align=right | 1.1 km || 
|-id=676 bgcolor=#fefefe
| 535676 ||  || — || March 31, 2008 || Mount Lemmon || Mount Lemmon Survey || MAS || align=right data-sort-value="0.62" | 620 m || 
|-id=677 bgcolor=#fefefe
| 535677 ||  || — || January 17, 2015 || Haleakala || Pan-STARRS ||  || align=right data-sort-value="0.71" | 710 m || 
|-id=678 bgcolor=#E9E9E9
| 535678 ||  || — || January 27, 2007 || Kitt Peak || Spacewatch ||  || align=right data-sort-value="0.65" | 650 m || 
|-id=679 bgcolor=#E9E9E9
| 535679 ||  || — || March 8, 2010 || WISE || WISE || DOR || align=right | 2.1 km || 
|-id=680 bgcolor=#E9E9E9
| 535680 ||  || — || December 30, 2005 || Mount Lemmon || Mount Lemmon Survey ||  || align=right | 1.4 km || 
|-id=681 bgcolor=#fefefe
| 535681 ||  || — || September 17, 2009 || Mount Lemmon || Mount Lemmon Survey ||  || align=right data-sort-value="0.68" | 680 m || 
|-id=682 bgcolor=#fefefe
| 535682 ||  || — || January 12, 1996 || Kitt Peak || Spacewatch || NYS || align=right data-sort-value="0.50" | 500 m || 
|-id=683 bgcolor=#d6d6d6
| 535683 ||  || — || March 13, 2010 || Mount Lemmon || Mount Lemmon Survey ||  || align=right | 2.6 km || 
|-id=684 bgcolor=#E9E9E9
| 535684 ||  || — || March 5, 2011 || Mount Lemmon || Mount Lemmon Survey ||  || align=right data-sort-value="0.70" | 700 m || 
|-id=685 bgcolor=#E9E9E9
| 535685 ||  || — || June 6, 2008 || Kitt Peak || Spacewatch ||  || align=right data-sort-value="0.84" | 840 m || 
|-id=686 bgcolor=#fefefe
| 535686 ||  || — || March 27, 2008 || Kitt Peak || Spacewatch ||  || align=right data-sort-value="0.65" | 650 m || 
|-id=687 bgcolor=#fefefe
| 535687 ||  || — || April 14, 2008 || Kitt Peak || Spacewatch || MAS || align=right data-sort-value="0.62" | 620 m || 
|-id=688 bgcolor=#E9E9E9
| 535688 ||  || — || February 17, 2010 || WISE || WISE ||  || align=right | 1.8 km || 
|-id=689 bgcolor=#fefefe
| 535689 ||  || — || January 17, 2015 || Kitt Peak || Spacewatch || V || align=right data-sort-value="0.76" | 760 m || 
|-id=690 bgcolor=#E9E9E9
| 535690 ||  || — || September 14, 2013 || Haleakala || Pan-STARRS ||  || align=right data-sort-value="0.79" | 790 m || 
|-id=691 bgcolor=#E9E9E9
| 535691 ||  || — || November 18, 2009 || Kitt Peak || Spacewatch ||  || align=right | 1.3 km || 
|-id=692 bgcolor=#E9E9E9
| 535692 ||  || — || February 21, 2006 || Anderson Mesa || LONEOS ||  || align=right | 2.1 km || 
|-id=693 bgcolor=#fefefe
| 535693 ||  || — || October 27, 2005 || Mount Lemmon || Mount Lemmon Survey ||  || align=right data-sort-value="0.67" | 670 m || 
|-id=694 bgcolor=#E9E9E9
| 535694 ||  || — || March 6, 2011 || Kitt Peak || Spacewatch ||  || align=right | 1.7 km || 
|-id=695 bgcolor=#E9E9E9
| 535695 ||  || — || December 30, 2005 || Kitt Peak || Spacewatch ||  || align=right | 1.7 km || 
|-id=696 bgcolor=#E9E9E9
| 535696 ||  || — || September 5, 2008 || Kitt Peak || Spacewatch || JUN || align=right data-sort-value="0.89" | 890 m || 
|-id=697 bgcolor=#fefefe
| 535697 ||  || — || October 5, 2013 || Mount Lemmon || Mount Lemmon Survey || MAS || align=right data-sort-value="0.67" | 670 m || 
|-id=698 bgcolor=#E9E9E9
| 535698 ||  || — || April 1, 2011 || Mount Lemmon || Mount Lemmon Survey ||  || align=right | 1.5 km || 
|-id=699 bgcolor=#E9E9E9
| 535699 ||  || — || September 5, 2013 || Kitt Peak || Spacewatch ||  || align=right | 1.7 km || 
|-id=700 bgcolor=#E9E9E9
| 535700 ||  || — || January 30, 2011 || Haleakala || Pan-STARRS ||  || align=right data-sort-value="0.73" | 730 m || 
|}

535701–535800 

|-bgcolor=#d6d6d6
| 535701 ||  || — || May 31, 2006 || Kitt Peak || Spacewatch ||  || align=right | 3.1 km || 
|-id=702 bgcolor=#d6d6d6
| 535702 ||  || — || May 24, 2010 || WISE || WISE || EOS || align=right | 3.0 km || 
|-id=703 bgcolor=#E9E9E9
| 535703 ||  || — || March 16, 2007 || Mount Lemmon || Mount Lemmon Survey ||  || align=right | 1.1 km || 
|-id=704 bgcolor=#d6d6d6
| 535704 ||  || — || October 2, 2003 || Kitt Peak || Spacewatch ||  || align=right | 2.8 km || 
|-id=705 bgcolor=#fefefe
| 535705 ||  || — || September 12, 2013 || Mount Lemmon || Mount Lemmon Survey ||  || align=right | 1.0 km || 
|-id=706 bgcolor=#fefefe
| 535706 ||  || — || January 17, 2015 || Haleakala || Pan-STARRS ||  || align=right data-sort-value="0.79" | 790 m || 
|-id=707 bgcolor=#E9E9E9
| 535707 ||  || — || October 23, 2013 || Haleakala || Pan-STARRS ||  || align=right | 2.3 km || 
|-id=708 bgcolor=#E9E9E9
| 535708 ||  || — || October 1, 2005 || Kitt Peak || Spacewatch ||  || align=right data-sort-value="0.84" | 840 m || 
|-id=709 bgcolor=#d6d6d6
| 535709 ||  || — || April 6, 2000 || Kitt Peak || Spacewatch ||  || align=right | 2.3 km || 
|-id=710 bgcolor=#d6d6d6
| 535710 ||  || — || November 6, 2013 || Haleakala || Pan-STARRS ||  || align=right | 2.6 km || 
|-id=711 bgcolor=#fefefe
| 535711 ||  || — || September 1, 2013 || Mount Lemmon || Mount Lemmon Survey ||  || align=right data-sort-value="0.80" | 800 m || 
|-id=712 bgcolor=#fefefe
| 535712 ||  || — || April 13, 2012 || Kitt Peak || Spacewatch ||  || align=right data-sort-value="0.72" | 720 m || 
|-id=713 bgcolor=#E9E9E9
| 535713 ||  || — || January 7, 2006 || Kitt Peak || Spacewatch ||  || align=right | 1.7 km || 
|-id=714 bgcolor=#fefefe
| 535714 ||  || — || April 20, 2012 || Mount Lemmon || Mount Lemmon Survey || V || align=right data-sort-value="0.49" | 490 m || 
|-id=715 bgcolor=#fefefe
| 535715 ||  || — || January 10, 2008 || Mount Lemmon || Mount Lemmon Survey ||  || align=right data-sort-value="0.60" | 600 m || 
|-id=716 bgcolor=#E9E9E9
| 535716 ||  || — || October 2, 2008 || Mount Lemmon || Mount Lemmon Survey ||  || align=right | 2.2 km || 
|-id=717 bgcolor=#E9E9E9
| 535717 ||  || — || November 10, 2013 || Mount Lemmon || Mount Lemmon Survey ||  || align=right data-sort-value="0.91" | 910 m || 
|-id=718 bgcolor=#d6d6d6
| 535718 ||  || — || June 16, 2012 || Haleakala || Pan-STARRS ||  || align=right | 2.1 km || 
|-id=719 bgcolor=#E9E9E9
| 535719 ||  || — || November 22, 2009 || Mount Lemmon || Mount Lemmon Survey ||  || align=right | 1.0 km || 
|-id=720 bgcolor=#d6d6d6
| 535720 ||  || — || November 9, 2013 || Haleakala || Pan-STARRS ||  || align=right | 2.2 km || 
|-id=721 bgcolor=#E9E9E9
| 535721 ||  || — || October 7, 2004 || Kitt Peak || Spacewatch ||  || align=right | 1.9 km || 
|-id=722 bgcolor=#E9E9E9
| 535722 ||  || — || April 4, 2011 || Kitt Peak || Spacewatch ||  || align=right | 2.1 km || 
|-id=723 bgcolor=#fefefe
| 535723 ||  || — || November 19, 2006 || Kitt Peak || Spacewatch ||  || align=right data-sort-value="0.64" | 640 m || 
|-id=724 bgcolor=#E9E9E9
| 535724 ||  || — || February 4, 2011 || Catalina || CSS ||  || align=right | 1.1 km || 
|-id=725 bgcolor=#fefefe
| 535725 ||  || — || November 26, 2014 || Haleakala || Pan-STARRS ||  || align=right data-sort-value="0.62" | 620 m || 
|-id=726 bgcolor=#fefefe
| 535726 ||  || — || September 30, 2003 || Kitt Peak || Spacewatch ||  || align=right data-sort-value="0.78" | 780 m || 
|-id=727 bgcolor=#E9E9E9
| 535727 ||  || — || January 15, 2007 || Catalina || CSS ||  || align=right | 1.2 km || 
|-id=728 bgcolor=#fefefe
| 535728 ||  || — || September 17, 2009 || Mount Lemmon || Mount Lemmon Survey ||  || align=right data-sort-value="0.95" | 950 m || 
|-id=729 bgcolor=#E9E9E9
| 535729 ||  || — || April 20, 2012 || Mount Lemmon || Mount Lemmon Survey ||  || align=right data-sort-value="0.91" | 910 m || 
|-id=730 bgcolor=#fefefe
| 535730 ||  || — || September 13, 2013 || Kitt Peak || Spacewatch ||  || align=right data-sort-value="0.86" | 860 m || 
|-id=731 bgcolor=#d6d6d6
| 535731 ||  || — || November 25, 2013 || Haleakala || Pan-STARRS ||  || align=right | 3.4 km || 
|-id=732 bgcolor=#d6d6d6
| 535732 ||  || — || December 17, 2014 || Haleakala || Pan-STARRS ||  || align=right | 3.0 km || 
|-id=733 bgcolor=#fefefe
| 535733 ||  || — || January 30, 2008 || Mount Lemmon || Mount Lemmon Survey ||  || align=right data-sort-value="0.72" | 720 m || 
|-id=734 bgcolor=#E9E9E9
| 535734 ||  || — || October 1, 2013 || Mount Lemmon || Mount Lemmon Survey ||  || align=right | 1.8 km || 
|-id=735 bgcolor=#d6d6d6
| 535735 ||  || — || March 12, 2010 || WISE || WISE ||  || align=right | 3.1 km || 
|-id=736 bgcolor=#E9E9E9
| 535736 ||  || — || August 28, 2005 || Kitt Peak || Spacewatch ||  || align=right data-sort-value="0.86" | 860 m || 
|-id=737 bgcolor=#d6d6d6
| 535737 ||  || — || December 19, 2004 || Kitt Peak || Spacewatch || TRE || align=right | 2.6 km || 
|-id=738 bgcolor=#d6d6d6
| 535738 ||  || — || March 29, 2011 || Catalina || CSS ||  || align=right | 2.1 km || 
|-id=739 bgcolor=#d6d6d6
| 535739 ||  || — || October 1, 2013 || Mount Lemmon || Mount Lemmon Survey || KOR || align=right data-sort-value="0.98" | 980 m || 
|-id=740 bgcolor=#E9E9E9
| 535740 ||  || — || January 15, 2010 || WISE || WISE ||  || align=right | 1.9 km || 
|-id=741 bgcolor=#E9E9E9
| 535741 ||  || — || September 20, 2009 || Kitt Peak || Spacewatch ||  || align=right | 1.1 km || 
|-id=742 bgcolor=#E9E9E9
| 535742 ||  || — || January 26, 2011 || Mount Lemmon || Mount Lemmon Survey || (5) || align=right data-sort-value="0.65" | 650 m || 
|-id=743 bgcolor=#E9E9E9
| 535743 ||  || — || September 30, 2013 || Mount Lemmon || Mount Lemmon Survey || NEM || align=right | 2.1 km || 
|-id=744 bgcolor=#d6d6d6
| 535744 ||  || — || April 1, 2010 || WISE || WISE ||  || align=right | 3.5 km || 
|-id=745 bgcolor=#d6d6d6
| 535745 ||  || — || October 9, 2008 || Mount Lemmon || Mount Lemmon Survey ||  || align=right | 2.7 km || 
|-id=746 bgcolor=#fefefe
| 535746 ||  || — || March 27, 2008 || Kitt Peak || Spacewatch ||  || align=right data-sort-value="0.71" | 710 m || 
|-id=747 bgcolor=#E9E9E9
| 535747 ||  || — || March 31, 2011 || Haleakala || Pan-STARRS ||  || align=right | 2.4 km || 
|-id=748 bgcolor=#fefefe
| 535748 ||  || — || March 30, 2008 || Kitt Peak || Spacewatch || MAS || align=right data-sort-value="0.68" | 680 m || 
|-id=749 bgcolor=#E9E9E9
| 535749 ||  || — || March 27, 2011 || Mount Lemmon || Mount Lemmon Survey ||  || align=right | 2.6 km || 
|-id=750 bgcolor=#E9E9E9
| 535750 ||  || — || January 26, 2006 || Mount Lemmon || Mount Lemmon Survey || GEF || align=right data-sort-value="0.87" | 870 m || 
|-id=751 bgcolor=#d6d6d6
| 535751 ||  || — || November 26, 2014 || Haleakala || Pan-STARRS ||  || align=right | 3.2 km || 
|-id=752 bgcolor=#E9E9E9
| 535752 ||  || — || December 8, 2005 || Kitt Peak || Spacewatch ||  || align=right | 2.3 km || 
|-id=753 bgcolor=#E9E9E9
| 535753 ||  || — || October 2, 2013 || Haleakala || Pan-STARRS ||  || align=right | 1.9 km || 
|-id=754 bgcolor=#d6d6d6
| 535754 ||  || — || December 19, 2009 || Kitt Peak || Spacewatch ||  || align=right | 2.0 km || 
|-id=755 bgcolor=#E9E9E9
| 535755 ||  || — || February 9, 2011 || Mount Lemmon || Mount Lemmon Survey ||  || align=right data-sort-value="0.87" | 870 m || 
|-id=756 bgcolor=#fefefe
| 535756 ||  || — || January 1, 2003 || Kitt Peak || Spacewatch ||  || align=right data-sort-value="0.58" | 580 m || 
|-id=757 bgcolor=#fefefe
| 535757 ||  || — || March 2, 1997 || Kitt Peak || Spacewatch ||  || align=right data-sort-value="0.78" | 780 m || 
|-id=758 bgcolor=#d6d6d6
| 535758 ||  || — || December 18, 2004 || Mount Lemmon || Mount Lemmon Survey ||  || align=right | 1.9 km || 
|-id=759 bgcolor=#d6d6d6
| 535759 ||  || — || August 13, 2012 || Haleakala || Pan-STARRS ||  || align=right | 3.2 km || 
|-id=760 bgcolor=#E9E9E9
| 535760 ||  || — || January 28, 2006 || Kitt Peak || Spacewatch ||  || align=right | 2.2 km || 
|-id=761 bgcolor=#fefefe
| 535761 ||  || — || January 30, 2008 || Mount Lemmon || Mount Lemmon Survey ||  || align=right data-sort-value="0.65" | 650 m || 
|-id=762 bgcolor=#E9E9E9
| 535762 ||  || — || November 20, 2009 || Kitt Peak || Spacewatch ||  || align=right | 1.8 km || 
|-id=763 bgcolor=#E9E9E9
| 535763 ||  || — || February 23, 2011 || Catalina || CSS ||  || align=right data-sort-value="0.95" | 950 m || 
|-id=764 bgcolor=#fefefe
| 535764 ||  || — || March 29, 2008 || Kitt Peak || Spacewatch ||  || align=right data-sort-value="0.60" | 600 m || 
|-id=765 bgcolor=#d6d6d6
| 535765 ||  || — || November 25, 2013 || Haleakala || Pan-STARRS ||  || align=right | 2.9 km || 
|-id=766 bgcolor=#fefefe
| 535766 ||  || — || May 15, 2012 || Haleakala || Pan-STARRS || V || align=right data-sort-value="0.55" | 550 m || 
|-id=767 bgcolor=#d6d6d6
| 535767 ||  || — || February 9, 2010 || Kitt Peak || Spacewatch ||  || align=right | 4.0 km || 
|-id=768 bgcolor=#d6d6d6
| 535768 ||  || — || December 1, 2003 || Kitt Peak || Spacewatch ||  || align=right | 2.1 km || 
|-id=769 bgcolor=#E9E9E9
| 535769 ||  || — || January 30, 2011 || Haleakala || Pan-STARRS || MAR || align=right | 1.2 km || 
|-id=770 bgcolor=#E9E9E9
| 535770 ||  || — || October 3, 2013 || Catalina || CSS ||  || align=right | 2.6 km || 
|-id=771 bgcolor=#d6d6d6
| 535771 ||  || — || January 15, 2009 || Kitt Peak || Spacewatch ||  || align=right | 2.8 km || 
|-id=772 bgcolor=#d6d6d6
| 535772 ||  || — || October 31, 2008 || Kitt Peak || Spacewatch ||  || align=right | 2.9 km || 
|-id=773 bgcolor=#E9E9E9
| 535773 ||  || — || November 27, 2014 || Mount Lemmon || Mount Lemmon Survey ||  || align=right | 1.4 km || 
|-id=774 bgcolor=#d6d6d6
| 535774 ||  || — || January 28, 2004 || Kitt Peak || Spacewatch ||  || align=right | 3.0 km || 
|-id=775 bgcolor=#E9E9E9
| 535775 ||  || — || February 23, 2007 || Kitt Peak || Spacewatch ||  || align=right data-sort-value="0.78" | 780 m || 
|-id=776 bgcolor=#d6d6d6
| 535776 ||  || — || May 26, 2010 || WISE || WISE ||  || align=right | 3.8 km || 
|-id=777 bgcolor=#d6d6d6
| 535777 ||  || — || November 30, 2008 || Mount Lemmon || Mount Lemmon Survey ||  || align=right | 2.6 km || 
|-id=778 bgcolor=#d6d6d6
| 535778 ||  || — || May 13, 2011 || Mount Lemmon || Mount Lemmon Survey ||  || align=right | 3.2 km || 
|-id=779 bgcolor=#E9E9E9
| 535779 ||  || — || July 30, 2008 || Kitt Peak || Spacewatch || MRX || align=right | 1.2 km || 
|-id=780 bgcolor=#fefefe
| 535780 ||  || — || September 14, 2006 || Kitt Peak || Spacewatch ||  || align=right data-sort-value="0.75" | 750 m || 
|-id=781 bgcolor=#fefefe
| 535781 ||  || — || January 11, 2008 || Mount Lemmon || Mount Lemmon Survey ||  || align=right data-sort-value="0.64" | 640 m || 
|-id=782 bgcolor=#E9E9E9
| 535782 ||  || — || August 29, 2009 || Kitt Peak || Spacewatch ||  || align=right data-sort-value="0.82" | 820 m || 
|-id=783 bgcolor=#fefefe
| 535783 ||  || — || March 29, 2000 || Kitt Peak || Spacewatch ||  || align=right data-sort-value="0.74" | 740 m || 
|-id=784 bgcolor=#E9E9E9
| 535784 ||  || — || November 26, 2014 || Haleakala || Pan-STARRS ||  || align=right data-sort-value="0.82" | 820 m || 
|-id=785 bgcolor=#fefefe
| 535785 ||  || — || March 2, 2008 || Kitt Peak || Spacewatch ||  || align=right data-sort-value="0.74" | 740 m || 
|-id=786 bgcolor=#E9E9E9
| 535786 ||  || — || November 6, 2005 || Kitt Peak || Spacewatch ||  || align=right | 1.5 km || 
|-id=787 bgcolor=#d6d6d6
| 535787 ||  || — || November 12, 2013 || Kitt Peak || Spacewatch ||  || align=right | 3.4 km || 
|-id=788 bgcolor=#d6d6d6
| 535788 ||  || — || October 2, 2013 || Kitt Peak || Spacewatch ||  || align=right | 2.9 km || 
|-id=789 bgcolor=#E9E9E9
| 535789 ||  || — || November 27, 2013 || Haleakala || Pan-STARRS ||  || align=right | 1.3 km || 
|-id=790 bgcolor=#d6d6d6
| 535790 ||  || — || March 27, 2010 || WISE || WISE || 7:4 || align=right | 4.0 km || 
|-id=791 bgcolor=#E9E9E9
| 535791 ||  || — || October 27, 2005 || Kitt Peak || Spacewatch ||  || align=right data-sort-value="0.73" | 730 m || 
|-id=792 bgcolor=#d6d6d6
| 535792 ||  || — || May 24, 2011 || Haleakala || Pan-STARRS || NAE || align=right | 2.3 km || 
|-id=793 bgcolor=#E9E9E9
| 535793 ||  || — || October 14, 2009 || Mount Lemmon || Mount Lemmon Survey ||  || align=right | 2.1 km || 
|-id=794 bgcolor=#E9E9E9
| 535794 ||  || — || April 6, 2011 || Mount Lemmon || Mount Lemmon Survey ||  || align=right | 2.2 km || 
|-id=795 bgcolor=#fefefe
| 535795 ||  || — || October 4, 2013 || Mount Lemmon || Mount Lemmon Survey ||  || align=right data-sort-value="0.86" | 860 m || 
|-id=796 bgcolor=#E9E9E9
| 535796 ||  || — || September 3, 2008 || La Sagra || OAM Obs. ||  || align=right | 2.6 km || 
|-id=797 bgcolor=#E9E9E9
| 535797 ||  || — || November 19, 2009 || Kitt Peak || Spacewatch ||  || align=right | 2.2 km || 
|-id=798 bgcolor=#E9E9E9
| 535798 ||  || — || August 26, 2009 || Catalina || CSS ||  || align=right | 2.4 km || 
|-id=799 bgcolor=#E9E9E9
| 535799 ||  || — || January 19, 2015 || Haleakala || Pan-STARRS ||  || align=right | 1.5 km || 
|-id=800 bgcolor=#fefefe
| 535800 ||  || — || December 20, 2014 || Haleakala || Pan-STARRS ||  || align=right data-sort-value="0.65" | 650 m || 
|}

535801–535900 

|-bgcolor=#E9E9E9
| 535801 ||  || — || September 18, 2004 || Socorro || LINEAR || GEF || align=right | 1.0 km || 
|-id=802 bgcolor=#fefefe
| 535802 ||  || — || January 19, 2015 || Mount Lemmon || Mount Lemmon Survey ||  || align=right data-sort-value="0.84" | 840 m || 
|-id=803 bgcolor=#fefefe
| 535803 ||  || — || January 19, 2015 || Mount Lemmon || Mount Lemmon Survey ||  || align=right data-sort-value="0.62" | 620 m || 
|-id=804 bgcolor=#fefefe
| 535804 ||  || — || January 17, 2007 || Kitt Peak || Spacewatch ||  || align=right data-sort-value="0.58" | 580 m || 
|-id=805 bgcolor=#d6d6d6
| 535805 ||  || — || January 20, 2009 || Mount Lemmon || Mount Lemmon Survey ||  || align=right | 3.6 km || 
|-id=806 bgcolor=#d6d6d6
| 535806 ||  || — || October 30, 2008 || Kitt Peak || Spacewatch || NAE || align=right | 2.3 km || 
|-id=807 bgcolor=#E9E9E9
| 535807 ||  || — || October 20, 2001 || Socorro || LINEAR || RAF || align=right data-sort-value="0.79" | 790 m || 
|-id=808 bgcolor=#fefefe
| 535808 ||  || — || March 6, 2008 || Kitt Peak || Spacewatch ||  || align=right data-sort-value="0.60" | 600 m || 
|-id=809 bgcolor=#E9E9E9
| 535809 ||  || — || December 17, 2014 || Haleakala || Pan-STARRS ||  || align=right data-sort-value="0.93" | 930 m || 
|-id=810 bgcolor=#d6d6d6
| 535810 ||  || — || January 19, 2015 || Haleakala || Pan-STARRS ||  || align=right | 2.3 km || 
|-id=811 bgcolor=#d6d6d6
| 535811 ||  || — || February 15, 2010 || Kitt Peak || Spacewatch ||  || align=right | 3.7 km || 
|-id=812 bgcolor=#d6d6d6
| 535812 ||  || — || June 21, 2010 || WISE || WISE ||  || align=right | 2.9 km || 
|-id=813 bgcolor=#fefefe
| 535813 ||  || — || January 2, 2011 || Mount Lemmon || Mount Lemmon Survey ||  || align=right data-sort-value="0.65" | 650 m || 
|-id=814 bgcolor=#E9E9E9
| 535814 ||  || — || November 10, 2009 || Kitt Peak || Spacewatch ||  || align=right | 1.1 km || 
|-id=815 bgcolor=#E9E9E9
| 535815 ||  || — || March 20, 2007 || Mount Lemmon || Mount Lemmon Survey ||  || align=right | 1.3 km || 
|-id=816 bgcolor=#E9E9E9
| 535816 ||  || — || November 28, 2014 || Haleakala || Pan-STARRS ||  || align=right data-sort-value="0.90" | 900 m || 
|-id=817 bgcolor=#E9E9E9
| 535817 ||  || — || August 8, 2012 || Haleakala || Pan-STARRS || EUN || align=right | 1.2 km || 
|-id=818 bgcolor=#E9E9E9
| 535818 ||  || — || September 20, 2009 || Mount Lemmon || Mount Lemmon Survey ||  || align=right | 1.1 km || 
|-id=819 bgcolor=#d6d6d6
| 535819 ||  || — || January 19, 2015 || Haleakala || Pan-STARRS ||  || align=right | 3.1 km || 
|-id=820 bgcolor=#E9E9E9
| 535820 ||  || — || May 5, 2011 || Mount Lemmon || Mount Lemmon Survey ||  || align=right | 1.7 km || 
|-id=821 bgcolor=#E9E9E9
| 535821 ||  || — || April 5, 2003 || Kitt Peak || Spacewatch ||  || align=right data-sort-value="0.76" | 760 m || 
|-id=822 bgcolor=#E9E9E9
| 535822 ||  || — || January 19, 2015 || Haleakala || Pan-STARRS ||  || align=right | 1.8 km || 
|-id=823 bgcolor=#E9E9E9
| 535823 ||  || — || January 19, 2015 || Haleakala || Pan-STARRS ||  || align=right | 1.0 km || 
|-id=824 bgcolor=#E9E9E9
| 535824 ||  || — || January 12, 2010 || Catalina || CSS || DOR || align=right | 2.1 km || 
|-id=825 bgcolor=#d6d6d6
| 535825 ||  || — || December 11, 2013 || Haleakala || Pan-STARRS ||  || align=right | 2.6 km || 
|-id=826 bgcolor=#E9E9E9
| 535826 ||  || — || February 9, 2010 || WISE || WISE ||  || align=right | 2.1 km || 
|-id=827 bgcolor=#E9E9E9
| 535827 ||  || — || January 19, 2015 || Haleakala || Pan-STARRS ||  || align=right | 1.9 km || 
|-id=828 bgcolor=#E9E9E9
| 535828 ||  || — || September 21, 2012 || Kitt Peak || Spacewatch ||  || align=right | 1.4 km || 
|-id=829 bgcolor=#fefefe
| 535829 ||  || — || October 3, 2013 || Haleakala || Pan-STARRS ||  || align=right data-sort-value="0.73" | 730 m || 
|-id=830 bgcolor=#d6d6d6
| 535830 ||  || — || December 29, 2008 || Socorro || LINEAR ||  || align=right | 3.3 km || 
|-id=831 bgcolor=#d6d6d6
| 535831 ||  || — || January 2, 2009 || Catalina || CSS ||  || align=right | 2.9 km || 
|-id=832 bgcolor=#E9E9E9
| 535832 ||  || — || May 1, 2011 || Haleakala || Pan-STARRS ||  || align=right | 1.4 km || 
|-id=833 bgcolor=#E9E9E9
| 535833 ||  || — || April 14, 2011 || Mount Lemmon || Mount Lemmon Survey ||  || align=right data-sort-value="0.93" | 930 m || 
|-id=834 bgcolor=#d6d6d6
| 535834 ||  || — || September 14, 2007 || Mount Lemmon || Mount Lemmon Survey ||  || align=right | 2.5 km || 
|-id=835 bgcolor=#d6d6d6
| 535835 ||  || — || January 13, 2010 || WISE || WISE ||  || align=right | 2.9 km || 
|-id=836 bgcolor=#fefefe
| 535836 ||  || — || April 13, 2004 || Kitt Peak || Spacewatch ||  || align=right data-sort-value="0.70" | 700 m || 
|-id=837 bgcolor=#E9E9E9
| 535837 ||  || — || January 19, 2015 || Haleakala || Pan-STARRS ||  || align=right | 1.2 km || 
|-id=838 bgcolor=#E9E9E9
| 535838 ||  || — || April 24, 2011 || Mount Lemmon || Mount Lemmon Survey ||  || align=right | 1.3 km || 
|-id=839 bgcolor=#d6d6d6
| 535839 ||  || — || October 10, 2012 || Haleakala || Pan-STARRS ||  || align=right | 2.6 km || 
|-id=840 bgcolor=#d6d6d6
| 535840 ||  || — || December 18, 2009 || Mount Lemmon || Mount Lemmon Survey ||  || align=right | 2.5 km || 
|-id=841 bgcolor=#d6d6d6
| 535841 ||  || — || February 12, 2011 || Mount Lemmon || Mount Lemmon Survey ||  || align=right | 3.1 km || 
|-id=842 bgcolor=#fefefe
| 535842 ||  || — || April 20, 2009 || Mount Lemmon || Mount Lemmon Survey ||  || align=right data-sort-value="0.69" | 690 m || 
|-id=843 bgcolor=#d6d6d6
| 535843 ||  || — || June 6, 2010 || WISE || WISE ||  || align=right | 3.1 km || 
|-id=844 bgcolor=#FFC2E0
| 535844 ||  || — || January 18, 2015 || Haleakala || Pan-STARRS || APOPHA || align=right data-sort-value="0.15" | 150 m || 
|-id=845 bgcolor=#E9E9E9
| 535845 ||  || — || December 6, 2005 || Mount Lemmon || Mount Lemmon Survey ||  || align=right | 1.6 km || 
|-id=846 bgcolor=#fefefe
| 535846 ||  || — || October 3, 2006 || Mount Lemmon || Mount Lemmon Survey ||  || align=right data-sort-value="0.89" | 890 m || 
|-id=847 bgcolor=#d6d6d6
| 535847 ||  || — || September 14, 2006 || Kitt Peak || Spacewatch || 7:4 || align=right | 3.1 km || 
|-id=848 bgcolor=#E9E9E9
| 535848 ||  || — || March 14, 2011 || Mount Lemmon || Mount Lemmon Survey ||  || align=right data-sort-value="0.67" | 670 m || 
|-id=849 bgcolor=#d6d6d6
| 535849 ||  || — || November 9, 2013 || Haleakala || Pan-STARRS ||  || align=right | 2.2 km || 
|-id=850 bgcolor=#d6d6d6
| 535850 ||  || — || November 11, 2013 || Mount Lemmon || Mount Lemmon Survey ||  || align=right | 2.5 km || 
|-id=851 bgcolor=#fefefe
| 535851 ||  || — || October 21, 2003 || Kitt Peak || Spacewatch ||  || align=right data-sort-value="0.58" | 580 m || 
|-id=852 bgcolor=#E9E9E9
| 535852 ||  || — || January 26, 2006 || Mount Lemmon || Mount Lemmon Survey ||  || align=right | 2.0 km || 
|-id=853 bgcolor=#E9E9E9
| 535853 ||  || — || October 11, 2005 || Kitt Peak || Spacewatch ||  || align=right data-sort-value="0.90" | 900 m || 
|-id=854 bgcolor=#d6d6d6
| 535854 ||  || — || August 10, 2007 || Kitt Peak || Spacewatch ||  || align=right | 2.5 km || 
|-id=855 bgcolor=#E9E9E9
| 535855 ||  || — || July 6, 2013 || Haleakala || Pan-STARRS ||  || align=right | 1.8 km || 
|-id=856 bgcolor=#E9E9E9
| 535856 ||  || — || March 9, 2007 || Mount Lemmon || Mount Lemmon Survey || BRG || align=right | 1.1 km || 
|-id=857 bgcolor=#fefefe
| 535857 ||  || — || October 23, 2006 || Kitt Peak || Spacewatch ||  || align=right data-sort-value="0.64" | 640 m || 
|-id=858 bgcolor=#E9E9E9
| 535858 ||  || — || January 29, 2011 || Kitt Peak || Spacewatch ||  || align=right data-sort-value="0.75" | 750 m || 
|-id=859 bgcolor=#d6d6d6
| 535859 ||  || — || January 17, 2015 || Haleakala || Pan-STARRS ||  || align=right | 2.4 km || 
|-id=860 bgcolor=#d6d6d6
| 535860 ||  || — || August 14, 2012 || Haleakala || Pan-STARRS ||  || align=right | 3.0 km || 
|-id=861 bgcolor=#d6d6d6
| 535861 ||  || — || August 13, 2012 || Haleakala || Pan-STARRS ||  || align=right | 2.8 km || 
|-id=862 bgcolor=#E9E9E9
| 535862 ||  || — || January 17, 2015 || Haleakala || Pan-STARRS ||  || align=right | 1.7 km || 
|-id=863 bgcolor=#fefefe
| 535863 ||  || — || November 3, 2010 || Kitt Peak || Spacewatch ||  || align=right data-sort-value="0.94" | 940 m || 
|-id=864 bgcolor=#d6d6d6
| 535864 ||  || — || December 18, 2009 || Mount Lemmon || Mount Lemmon Survey ||  || align=right | 2.1 km || 
|-id=865 bgcolor=#d6d6d6
| 535865 ||  || — || October 5, 2013 || Kitt Peak || Spacewatch || KOR || align=right | 1.4 km || 
|-id=866 bgcolor=#fefefe
| 535866 ||  || — || January 28, 2004 || Kitt Peak || Spacewatch ||  || align=right data-sort-value="0.60" | 600 m || 
|-id=867 bgcolor=#d6d6d6
| 535867 ||  || — || October 8, 2008 || Mount Lemmon || Mount Lemmon Survey ||  || align=right | 1.5 km || 
|-id=868 bgcolor=#fefefe
| 535868 ||  || — || January 17, 2015 || Haleakala || Pan-STARRS ||  || align=right data-sort-value="0.72" | 720 m || 
|-id=869 bgcolor=#E9E9E9
| 535869 ||  || — || September 20, 2009 || Mount Lemmon || Mount Lemmon Survey ||  || align=right | 1.1 km || 
|-id=870 bgcolor=#fefefe
| 535870 ||  || — || January 17, 2015 || Haleakala || Pan-STARRS ||  || align=right data-sort-value="0.58" | 580 m || 
|-id=871 bgcolor=#fefefe
| 535871 ||  || — || March 1, 2008 || Kitt Peak || Spacewatch ||  || align=right data-sort-value="0.60" | 600 m || 
|-id=872 bgcolor=#fefefe
| 535872 ||  || — || November 27, 2010 || Mount Lemmon || Mount Lemmon Survey ||  || align=right data-sort-value="0.75" | 750 m || 
|-id=873 bgcolor=#d6d6d6
| 535873 ||  || — || November 17, 1998 || Kitt Peak || Spacewatch ||  || align=right | 2.3 km || 
|-id=874 bgcolor=#E9E9E9
| 535874 ||  || — || August 12, 2013 || Haleakala || Pan-STARRS ||  || align=right | 1.4 km || 
|-id=875 bgcolor=#E9E9E9
| 535875 ||  || — || October 22, 2009 || Mount Lemmon || Mount Lemmon Survey ||  || align=right | 1.7 km || 
|-id=876 bgcolor=#d6d6d6
| 535876 ||  || — || October 10, 2008 || Mount Lemmon || Mount Lemmon Survey ||  || align=right | 2.4 km || 
|-id=877 bgcolor=#d6d6d6
| 535877 ||  || — || September 23, 2008 || Kitt Peak || Spacewatch ||  || align=right | 2.0 km || 
|-id=878 bgcolor=#E9E9E9
| 535878 ||  || — || August 24, 2008 || Kitt Peak || Spacewatch ||  || align=right | 1.8 km || 
|-id=879 bgcolor=#E9E9E9
| 535879 ||  || — || November 11, 2009 || Kitt Peak || Spacewatch ||  || align=right | 1.8 km || 
|-id=880 bgcolor=#d6d6d6
| 535880 ||  || — || May 13, 2010 || WISE || WISE ||  || align=right | 2.8 km || 
|-id=881 bgcolor=#d6d6d6
| 535881 ||  || — || November 26, 2014 || Haleakala || Pan-STARRS ||  || align=right | 3.1 km || 
|-id=882 bgcolor=#E9E9E9
| 535882 ||  || — || October 29, 2005 || Kitt Peak || Spacewatch ||  || align=right data-sort-value="0.73" | 730 m || 
|-id=883 bgcolor=#E9E9E9
| 535883 ||  || — || January 30, 2006 || Kitt Peak || Spacewatch ||  || align=right | 1.4 km || 
|-id=884 bgcolor=#fefefe
| 535884 ||  || — || November 27, 2010 || Mount Lemmon || Mount Lemmon Survey || MAS || align=right data-sort-value="0.63" | 630 m || 
|-id=885 bgcolor=#E9E9E9
| 535885 ||  || — || October 27, 2009 || Mount Lemmon || Mount Lemmon Survey ||  || align=right | 1.2 km || 
|-id=886 bgcolor=#E9E9E9
| 535886 ||  || — || March 11, 2011 || Kitt Peak || Spacewatch ||  || align=right | 1.00 km || 
|-id=887 bgcolor=#E9E9E9
| 535887 ||  || — || August 15, 2013 || Haleakala || Pan-STARRS ||  || align=right | 1.5 km || 
|-id=888 bgcolor=#d6d6d6
| 535888 ||  || — || August 14, 2012 || Haleakala || Pan-STARRS ||  || align=right | 2.9 km || 
|-id=889 bgcolor=#fefefe
| 535889 ||  || — || June 8, 2012 || Mount Lemmon || Mount Lemmon Survey ||  || align=right data-sort-value="0.84" | 840 m || 
|-id=890 bgcolor=#E9E9E9
| 535890 ||  || — || October 4, 1999 || Kitt Peak || Spacewatch ||  || align=right | 2.0 km || 
|-id=891 bgcolor=#E9E9E9
| 535891 ||  || — || August 21, 2008 || Kitt Peak || Spacewatch ||  || align=right | 2.1 km || 
|-id=892 bgcolor=#E9E9E9
| 535892 ||  || — || January 23, 2006 || Kitt Peak || Spacewatch ||  || align=right | 1.8 km || 
|-id=893 bgcolor=#E9E9E9
| 535893 ||  || — || November 17, 2000 || Kitt Peak || Spacewatch ||  || align=right | 1.7 km || 
|-id=894 bgcolor=#fefefe
| 535894 ||  || — || November 5, 2007 || Kitt Peak || Spacewatch ||  || align=right data-sort-value="0.57" | 570 m || 
|-id=895 bgcolor=#E9E9E9
| 535895 ||  || — || October 26, 2009 || Kitt Peak || Spacewatch ||  || align=right | 2.2 km || 
|-id=896 bgcolor=#d6d6d6
| 535896 ||  || — || January 20, 2015 || Kitt Peak || Spacewatch ||  || align=right | 3.1 km || 
|-id=897 bgcolor=#E9E9E9
| 535897 ||  || — || January 23, 2006 || Kitt Peak || Spacewatch ||  || align=right | 1.8 km || 
|-id=898 bgcolor=#d6d6d6
| 535898 ||  || — || May 9, 2006 || Mount Lemmon || Mount Lemmon Survey ||  || align=right | 2.1 km || 
|-id=899 bgcolor=#E9E9E9
| 535899 ||  || — || November 25, 2005 || Kitt Peak || Spacewatch || MIS || align=right | 1.8 km || 
|-id=900 bgcolor=#fefefe
| 535900 ||  || — || December 3, 2010 || Mount Lemmon || Mount Lemmon Survey || V || align=right data-sort-value="0.48" | 480 m || 
|}

535901–536000 

|-bgcolor=#fefefe
| 535901 ||  || — || January 20, 2015 || Haleakala || Pan-STARRS || NYS || align=right data-sort-value="0.55" | 550 m || 
|-id=902 bgcolor=#E9E9E9
| 535902 ||  || — || August 14, 2013 || Haleakala || Pan-STARRS ||  || align=right | 1.9 km || 
|-id=903 bgcolor=#fefefe
| 535903 ||  || — || September 26, 2005 || Kitt Peak || Spacewatch ||  || align=right data-sort-value="0.87" | 870 m || 
|-id=904 bgcolor=#E9E9E9
| 535904 ||  || — || February 21, 2006 || Mount Lemmon || Mount Lemmon Survey ||  || align=right | 1.8 km || 
|-id=905 bgcolor=#E9E9E9
| 535905 ||  || — || January 2, 2011 || Mount Lemmon || Mount Lemmon Survey ||  || align=right data-sort-value="0.95" | 950 m || 
|-id=906 bgcolor=#fefefe
| 535906 ||  || — || March 10, 2008 || Mount Lemmon || Mount Lemmon Survey ||  || align=right data-sort-value="0.72" | 720 m || 
|-id=907 bgcolor=#fefefe
| 535907 ||  || — || August 28, 2013 || Mount Lemmon || Mount Lemmon Survey ||  || align=right data-sort-value="0.69" | 690 m || 
|-id=908 bgcolor=#E9E9E9
| 535908 ||  || — || March 9, 2011 || Mount Lemmon || Mount Lemmon Survey ||  || align=right data-sort-value="0.67" | 670 m || 
|-id=909 bgcolor=#d6d6d6
| 535909 ||  || — || September 30, 2013 || Mount Lemmon || Mount Lemmon Survey ||  || align=right | 2.4 km || 
|-id=910 bgcolor=#fefefe
| 535910 ||  || — || January 14, 2011 || Mount Lemmon || Mount Lemmon Survey ||  || align=right data-sort-value="0.70" | 700 m || 
|-id=911 bgcolor=#d6d6d6
| 535911 ||  || — || January 8, 2010 || Kitt Peak || Spacewatch ||  || align=right | 1.9 km || 
|-id=912 bgcolor=#E9E9E9
| 535912 ||  || — || January 27, 2007 || Mount Lemmon || Mount Lemmon Survey ||  || align=right data-sort-value="0.58" | 580 m || 
|-id=913 bgcolor=#d6d6d6
| 535913 ||  || — || September 22, 2008 || Kitt Peak || Spacewatch ||  || align=right | 2.0 km || 
|-id=914 bgcolor=#d6d6d6
| 535914 ||  || — || October 27, 2008 || Kitt Peak || Spacewatch ||  || align=right | 2.0 km || 
|-id=915 bgcolor=#E9E9E9
| 535915 ||  || — || May 28, 2008 || Mount Lemmon || Mount Lemmon Survey ||  || align=right | 1.2 km || 
|-id=916 bgcolor=#fefefe
| 535916 ||  || — || October 20, 2006 || Kitt Peak || Spacewatch ||  || align=right data-sort-value="0.60" | 600 m || 
|-id=917 bgcolor=#d6d6d6
| 535917 ||  || — || August 26, 2012 || Haleakala || Pan-STARRS ||  || align=right | 3.9 km || 
|-id=918 bgcolor=#E9E9E9
| 535918 ||  || — || February 22, 2011 || Kitt Peak || Spacewatch ||  || align=right | 1.4 km || 
|-id=919 bgcolor=#fefefe
| 535919 ||  || — || December 22, 2006 || Kitt Peak || Spacewatch ||  || align=right data-sort-value="0.83" | 830 m || 
|-id=920 bgcolor=#E9E9E9
| 535920 ||  || — || September 3, 2013 || Kitt Peak || Spacewatch ||  || align=right | 1.3 km || 
|-id=921 bgcolor=#E9E9E9
| 535921 ||  || — || February 13, 2011 || Mount Lemmon || Mount Lemmon Survey ||  || align=right | 1.1 km || 
|-id=922 bgcolor=#E9E9E9
| 535922 ||  || — || January 20, 2015 || Haleakala || Pan-STARRS ||  || align=right | 1.1 km || 
|-id=923 bgcolor=#fefefe
| 535923 ||  || — || January 29, 2011 || Mount Lemmon || Mount Lemmon Survey ||  || align=right data-sort-value="0.63" | 630 m || 
|-id=924 bgcolor=#E9E9E9
| 535924 ||  || — || November 4, 2004 || Kitt Peak || Spacewatch ||  || align=right | 1.7 km || 
|-id=925 bgcolor=#fefefe
| 535925 ||  || — || November 25, 2006 || Kitt Peak || Spacewatch ||  || align=right data-sort-value="0.71" | 710 m || 
|-id=926 bgcolor=#E9E9E9
| 535926 ||  || — || August 15, 2013 || Haleakala || Pan-STARRS ||  || align=right data-sort-value="0.69" | 690 m || 
|-id=927 bgcolor=#d6d6d6
| 535927 ||  || — || September 12, 2007 || Catalina || CSS ||  || align=right | 3.0 km || 
|-id=928 bgcolor=#fefefe
| 535928 ||  || — || February 13, 2008 || Mount Lemmon || Mount Lemmon Survey ||  || align=right data-sort-value="0.57" | 570 m || 
|-id=929 bgcolor=#d6d6d6
| 535929 ||  || — || October 8, 2008 || Kitt Peak || Spacewatch ||  || align=right | 1.8 km || 
|-id=930 bgcolor=#E9E9E9
| 535930 ||  || — || September 19, 1995 || Kitt Peak || Spacewatch ||  || align=right | 1.4 km || 
|-id=931 bgcolor=#E9E9E9
| 535931 ||  || — || January 20, 2015 || Haleakala || Pan-STARRS ||  || align=right | 1.0 km || 
|-id=932 bgcolor=#d6d6d6
| 535932 ||  || — || October 23, 2008 || Kitt Peak || Spacewatch || KOR || align=right | 1.1 km || 
|-id=933 bgcolor=#d6d6d6
| 535933 ||  || — || May 24, 2006 || Mount Lemmon || Mount Lemmon Survey ||  || align=right | 2.1 km || 
|-id=934 bgcolor=#E9E9E9
| 535934 ||  || — || October 25, 2005 || Catalina || CSS ||  || align=right data-sort-value="0.97" | 970 m || 
|-id=935 bgcolor=#d6d6d6
| 535935 ||  || — || October 28, 2013 || Mount Lemmon || Mount Lemmon Survey ||  || align=right | 2.8 km || 
|-id=936 bgcolor=#d6d6d6
| 535936 ||  || — || August 17, 2012 || Haleakala || Pan-STARRS ||  || align=right | 3.2 km || 
|-id=937 bgcolor=#d6d6d6
| 535937 ||  || — || January 20, 2015 || Haleakala || Pan-STARRS ||  || align=right | 2.0 km || 
|-id=938 bgcolor=#fefefe
| 535938 ||  || — || March 26, 2008 || Mount Lemmon || Mount Lemmon Survey ||  || align=right data-sort-value="0.59" | 590 m || 
|-id=939 bgcolor=#fefefe
| 535939 ||  || — || February 26, 2008 || Mount Lemmon || Mount Lemmon Survey ||  || align=right data-sort-value="0.66" | 660 m || 
|-id=940 bgcolor=#d6d6d6
| 535940 ||  || — || October 9, 2008 || Kitt Peak || Spacewatch ||  || align=right | 2.0 km || 
|-id=941 bgcolor=#E9E9E9
| 535941 ||  || — || August 13, 2012 || Siding Spring || SSS || EUN || align=right data-sort-value="0.99" | 990 m || 
|-id=942 bgcolor=#d6d6d6
| 535942 ||  || — || September 19, 2012 || Mount Lemmon || Mount Lemmon Survey ||  || align=right | 2.5 km || 
|-id=943 bgcolor=#d6d6d6
| 535943 ||  || — || August 14, 2012 || Haleakala || Pan-STARRS ||  || align=right | 3.0 km || 
|-id=944 bgcolor=#d6d6d6
| 535944 ||  || — || November 25, 2013 || Haleakala || Pan-STARRS ||  || align=right | 2.6 km || 
|-id=945 bgcolor=#E9E9E9
| 535945 ||  || — || November 11, 2009 || Mount Lemmon || Mount Lemmon Survey ||  || align=right data-sort-value="0.83" | 830 m || 
|-id=946 bgcolor=#E9E9E9
| 535946 ||  || — || October 27, 1995 || Kitt Peak || Spacewatch || AEO || align=right data-sort-value="0.93" | 930 m || 
|-id=947 bgcolor=#fefefe
| 535947 ||  || — || March 10, 2008 || Kitt Peak || Spacewatch || V || align=right data-sort-value="0.48" | 480 m || 
|-id=948 bgcolor=#d6d6d6
| 535948 ||  || — || February 16, 2004 || Kitt Peak || Spacewatch ||  || align=right | 2.9 km || 
|-id=949 bgcolor=#fefefe
| 535949 ||  || — || October 7, 2013 || Kitt Peak || Spacewatch ||  || align=right data-sort-value="0.72" | 720 m || 
|-id=950 bgcolor=#fefefe
| 535950 ||  || — || November 7, 2010 || Mount Lemmon || Mount Lemmon Survey ||  || align=right data-sort-value="0.65" | 650 m || 
|-id=951 bgcolor=#d6d6d6
| 535951 ||  || — || January 20, 2015 || Haleakala || Pan-STARRS ||  || align=right | 2.5 km || 
|-id=952 bgcolor=#d6d6d6
| 535952 ||  || — || January 18, 2009 || Mount Lemmon || Mount Lemmon Survey ||  || align=right | 2.4 km || 
|-id=953 bgcolor=#E9E9E9
| 535953 ||  || — || February 25, 2011 || Mount Lemmon || Mount Lemmon Survey ||  || align=right data-sort-value="0.85" | 850 m || 
|-id=954 bgcolor=#fefefe
| 535954 ||  || — || January 30, 2004 || Kitt Peak || Spacewatch ||  || align=right data-sort-value="0.59" | 590 m || 
|-id=955 bgcolor=#fefefe
| 535955 ||  || — || December 14, 2010 || Mount Lemmon || Mount Lemmon Survey || MAS || align=right data-sort-value="0.65" | 650 m || 
|-id=956 bgcolor=#E9E9E9
| 535956 ||  || — || September 14, 2013 || Haleakala || Pan-STARRS ||  || align=right data-sort-value="0.87" | 870 m || 
|-id=957 bgcolor=#d6d6d6
| 535957 ||  || — || August 19, 2006 || Kitt Peak || Spacewatch ||  || align=right | 2.8 km || 
|-id=958 bgcolor=#E9E9E9
| 535958 ||  || — || February 23, 2007 || Mount Lemmon || Mount Lemmon Survey ||  || align=right data-sort-value="0.76" | 760 m || 
|-id=959 bgcolor=#E9E9E9
| 535959 ||  || — || January 4, 2010 || Kitt Peak || Spacewatch || AST || align=right | 1.8 km || 
|-id=960 bgcolor=#d6d6d6
| 535960 ||  || — || October 23, 2008 || Kitt Peak || Spacewatch ||  || align=right | 1.6 km || 
|-id=961 bgcolor=#d6d6d6
| 535961 ||  || — || January 18, 2015 || Haleakala || Pan-STARRS ||  || align=right | 2.5 km || 
|-id=962 bgcolor=#fefefe
| 535962 ||  || — || December 14, 2010 || Mount Lemmon || Mount Lemmon Survey ||  || align=right data-sort-value="0.55" | 550 m || 
|-id=963 bgcolor=#E9E9E9
| 535963 ||  || — || January 20, 2015 || Haleakala || Pan-STARRS || ADE || align=right | 1.5 km || 
|-id=964 bgcolor=#E9E9E9
| 535964 ||  || — || January 20, 2015 || Haleakala || Pan-STARRS ||  || align=right data-sort-value="0.90" | 900 m || 
|-id=965 bgcolor=#E9E9E9
| 535965 ||  || — || December 20, 2009 || Mount Lemmon || Mount Lemmon Survey ||  || align=right | 1.8 km || 
|-id=966 bgcolor=#d6d6d6
| 535966 ||  || — || November 10, 2013 || Mount Lemmon || Mount Lemmon Survey ||  || align=right | 2.7 km || 
|-id=967 bgcolor=#E9E9E9
| 535967 ||  || — || December 25, 2005 || Kitt Peak || Spacewatch ||  || align=right | 1.3 km || 
|-id=968 bgcolor=#E9E9E9
| 535968 ||  || — || April 2, 2010 || WISE || WISE ||  || align=right | 1.8 km || 
|-id=969 bgcolor=#d6d6d6
| 535969 ||  || — || August 10, 2007 || Kitt Peak || Spacewatch ||  || align=right | 2.8 km || 
|-id=970 bgcolor=#E9E9E9
| 535970 ||  || — || January 18, 2015 || Haleakala || Pan-STARRS ||  || align=right | 1.3 km || 
|-id=971 bgcolor=#E9E9E9
| 535971 ||  || — || November 1, 2005 || Mount Lemmon || Mount Lemmon Survey ||  || align=right | 1.5 km || 
|-id=972 bgcolor=#E9E9E9
| 535972 ||  || — || November 27, 2014 || Haleakala || Pan-STARRS ||  || align=right | 1.7 km || 
|-id=973 bgcolor=#E9E9E9
| 535973 ||  || — || August 3, 2008 || La Sagra || OAM Obs. ||  || align=right | 2.8 km || 
|-id=974 bgcolor=#fefefe
| 535974 ||  || — || October 9, 2010 || Catalina || CSS ||  || align=right data-sort-value="0.81" | 810 m || 
|-id=975 bgcolor=#fefefe
| 535975 ||  || — || January 20, 2015 || Haleakala || Pan-STARRS ||  || align=right data-sort-value="0.70" | 700 m || 
|-id=976 bgcolor=#d6d6d6
| 535976 ||  || — || September 22, 2012 || Mount Lemmon || Mount Lemmon Survey ||  || align=right | 3.0 km || 
|-id=977 bgcolor=#E9E9E9
| 535977 ||  || — || February 6, 2002 || Kitt Peak || Spacewatch ||  || align=right | 1.3 km || 
|-id=978 bgcolor=#E9E9E9
| 535978 ||  || — || October 25, 2009 || Kitt Peak || Spacewatch ||  || align=right | 1.3 km || 
|-id=979 bgcolor=#d6d6d6
| 535979 ||  || — || September 19, 1995 || Kitt Peak || Spacewatch ||  || align=right | 2.9 km || 
|-id=980 bgcolor=#d6d6d6
| 535980 ||  || — || October 28, 2013 || Kitt Peak || Spacewatch ||  || align=right | 2.4 km || 
|-id=981 bgcolor=#fefefe
| 535981 ||  || — || April 13, 2008 || Mount Lemmon || Mount Lemmon Survey ||  || align=right data-sort-value="0.50" | 500 m || 
|-id=982 bgcolor=#fefefe
| 535982 ||  || — || November 11, 2010 || Mount Lemmon || Mount Lemmon Survey ||  || align=right data-sort-value="0.50" | 500 m || 
|-id=983 bgcolor=#d6d6d6
| 535983 ||  || — || December 30, 2008 || Mount Lemmon || Mount Lemmon Survey ||  || align=right | 2.8 km || 
|-id=984 bgcolor=#fefefe
| 535984 ||  || — || October 31, 2010 || Kitt Peak || Spacewatch ||  || align=right data-sort-value="0.64" | 640 m || 
|-id=985 bgcolor=#C7FF8F
| 535985 ||  || — || December 31, 2012 || Haleakala || Pan-STARRS || centaur || align=right | 46 km || 
|-id=986 bgcolor=#C2E0FF
| 535986 ||  || — || October 31, 2012 || Haleakala || Pan-STARRS || other TNOcritical || align=right | 193 km || 
|-id=987 bgcolor=#C2E0FF
| 535987 ||  || — || January 30, 2011 || Haleakala || Pan-STARRS || other TNOcritical || align=right | 187 km || 
|-id=988 bgcolor=#C2E0FF
| 535988 ||  || — || July 31, 2010 || Haleakala || Pan-STARRS || other TNO || align=right | 140 km || 
|-id=989 bgcolor=#C2E0FF
| 535989 ||  || — || May 10, 2010 || Haleakala || Pan-STARRS || cubewano (cold)critical || align=right | 312 km || 
|-id=990 bgcolor=#C2E0FF
| 535990 ||  || — || May 10, 2010 || Haleakala || Pan-STARRS || cubewano (hot) || align=right | 203 km || 
|-id=991 bgcolor=#C2E0FF
| 535991 ||  || — || May 10, 2010 || Haleakala || Pan-STARRS || res2:5critical || align=right | 293 km || 
|-id=992 bgcolor=#C2E0FF
| 535992 ||  || — || January 25, 2012 || Haleakala || Pan-STARRS || other TNOcritical || align=right | 125 km || 
|-id=993 bgcolor=#C2E0FF
| 535993 ||  || — || December 18, 2010 || Haleakala || Pan-STARRS || other TNO || align=right | 230 km || 
|-id=994 bgcolor=#C2E0FF
| 535994 ||  || — || February 27, 2012 || Haleakala || Pan-STARRS || SDO || align=right | 243 km || 
|-id=995 bgcolor=#fefefe
| 535995 ||  || — || September 26, 2013 || Catalina || CSS ||  || align=right data-sort-value="0.85" | 850 m || 
|-id=996 bgcolor=#d6d6d6
| 535996 ||  || — || January 18, 2015 || Haleakala || Pan-STARRS ||  || align=right | 2.5 km || 
|-id=997 bgcolor=#E9E9E9
| 535997 ||  || — || February 4, 2006 || Catalina || CSS ||  || align=right | 1.3 km || 
|-id=998 bgcolor=#E9E9E9
| 535998 ||  || — || January 20, 2015 || Mount Lemmon || Mount Lemmon Survey ||  || align=right | 1.4 km || 
|-id=999 bgcolor=#E9E9E9
| 535999 ||  || — || January 21, 2015 || Haleakala || Pan-STARRS ||  || align=right | 2.2 km || 
|-id=000 bgcolor=#d6d6d6
| 536000 ||  || — || January 20, 2015 || Haleakala || Pan-STARRS ||  || align=right | 2.0 km || 
|}

References

External links 
 Discovery Circumstances: Numbered Minor Planets (535001)–(540000) (IAU Minor Planet Center)

0535